= Itô isometry =

Term in stochastic calculus

In mathematics, the Itô isometry, named after Kiyoshi Itô, is a crucial fact about Itô stochastic integrals. One of its main applications is to enable the computation of variances for random variables that are given as Itô integrals.

Let $W : [0, T] \times \Omega \to \mathbb{R}$ denote the canonical real-valued Wiener process defined up to time $T > 0$, and let $X : [0, T] \times \Omega \to \mathbb{R}$ be a stochastic process that is adapted to the natural filtration $\mathcal{F}_{*}^{W}$ of the Wiener process. Then

$$\operatorname{E} \left[ \left( \int_0^T X_t \, \mathrm{d} W_t \right)^2 \right] = \operatorname{E} \left[ \int_0^T X_t^2 \, \mathrm{d} t \right],$$

where $\operatorname{E}$ denotes expectation with respect to classical Wiener measure.

In other words, the Itô integral, as a function from the space $L^2_{\mathrm{ad}} ([0,T] \times \Omega)$ of square-integrable adapted processes to the space $L^2 (\Omega)$ of square-integrable random variables, is an isometry of normed vector spaces with respect to the norms induced by the inner products

$$\begin{align}
( X, Y )_{L^2_{\mathrm{ad}} ([0,T] \times \Omega)} & := \operatorname{E} \left( \int_0^T X_t \, Y_t \, \mathrm{d} t \right)
\end{align}$$

and

$$( A, B )_{L^2 (\Omega)} := \operatorname{E} ( A B ) .$$

As a consequence, the Itô integral respects these inner products as well, i.e. we can write

$$\operatorname{E} \left[ \left( \int_0^T X_t \, \mathrm{d} W_t \right) \left( \int_0^T Y_t \, \mathrm{d} W_t \right) \right] = \operatorname{E} \left[ \int_0^T X_t Y_t \, \mathrm{d} t \right]$$

for $X, Y \in L^2_{\mathrm{ad}} ([0,T] \times \Omega)$ .

== Numerical Simulation ==
The Itô isometry can be illustrated through numerical simulation using Monte Carlo methods. Such simulations help verify the theoretical relationship between the expected value of squared stochastic integrals and the expected value of integrated squared processes. A typical Monte Carlo experiment involves generating numerous sample paths of Brownian motion and computing both sides of the isometry equation for different choices of the integrand process $X_t$. The simulation approximates the continuous-time stochastic integral using a discrete-time summation:

$\int_0^T X_t \, dW_t \approx \sum_{i=0}^{N-1} X_{t_i} \Delta W_i$

where $\Delta W_i = W_{t_{i+1}} - W_{t_i}$ represents the Brownian increments over small time intervals. The isometry can be demonstrated using various processes $X_t$ on the interval $[0,1]$:

1. Constant process: $X_t = 1$
  - Analytical value: $\mathbb{E}[\int_0^1 1^2 \, dt] = 1$,
2. Linear deterministic process: $X_t = t$
  - Analytical value: $\mathbb{E}[\int_0^1 t^2 \, dt] = \frac{1}{3}$,
3. Trigonometric deterministic process: $X_t = \sin(\pi t)$
  - Analytical value: $\mathbb{E}[\int_0^1 \sin^2(\pi t) \, dt] = \frac{1}{2}$,
4. Path-dependent stochastic process: $X_t = W_t$
  - Analytical value: $\mathbb{E}[\int_0^1 W_t^2 \, dt] = \frac{1}{2}$,
5. Compensated Poisson ($M_t = N_t - \lambda t$): $X_t = 1$
  - Analytical value: $\lambda \int_0^T 1^2 dt = \lambda T$.

# ============================================================
#  Convergence test for five processes
#  – 4 Brownian‑based Itô integrals
#  – 1 compensated‑Poisson martingale integral
#
#  Output:
#    • nicely formatted error table
#    • log–log convergence plot
#      – each Brownian curve in its own colour
#      – Poisson curve orange & dashed
# ============================================================

import numpy as np
import pandas as pd
import matplotlib.pyplot as plt
from IPython.display import display

np.random.seed(42)  # reproducible demo

# ---------------------- global settings ---------------------
T = 1.0  # horizon
lam = 3.0  # Poisson intensity λ
M_paths = 20_000  # Monte‑Carlo paths
N_list = [50, 100, 200, 500, 1000, 2000, 5000]  # mesh refinements

# dataframe to hold absolute errors
index = pd.Index(N_list, name="N")
err_table = pd.DataFrame(index=index, columns=["1", "t", "sin(πt)", "W_t", "Poisson‑1"])

# -------------------- main simulation loop ------------------
for N in N_list:
    dt = T / N
    sqrt_dt = np.sqrt(dt)
    t_left = np.linspace(0.0, T, N + 1)[:-1]  # left endpoints (length N)

    # --- Brownian increments & paths ------------------------
    dW = np.random.normal(0.0, sqrt_dt, size=(M_paths, N))
    W = np.zeros((M_paths, N + 1))
    W[:, 1:] = np.cumsum(dW, axis=1)

    # --- Compensated Poisson increments --------------------
    dN = np.random.poisson(lam * dt, size=(M_paths, N))
    dM = dN - lam * dt

    # helper for deterministic X_t
    lhs_det = lambda X_grid, inc: np.mean((inc * X_grid).sum(axis=1) ** 2)

    # 1) X_t ≡ 1  with Brownian integrator
    X1 = np.ones_like(t_left)
    err_table.loc[N, "1"] = abs(lhs_det(X1, dW) - T)

    # 2) X_t = t
    Xt = t_left
    err_table.loc[N, "t"] = abs(lhs_det(Xt, dW) - T**3 / 3)

    # 3) X_t = sin(π t)
    Xs = np.sin(np.pi * t_left)
    err_table.loc[N, "sin(πt)"] = abs(lhs_det(Xs, dW) - 0.5 * T)

    # 4) X_t = W_t   (path‑dependent)
    lhs_W = np.mean((W[:, :-1] * dW).sum(axis=1) ** 2)
    err_table.loc[N, "W_t"] = abs(lhs_W - T**2 / 2)

    # 5) compensated Poisson with X_t ≡ 1
    err_table.loc[N, "Poisson‑1"] = abs(lhs_det(X1, dM) - lam * T)

# ---------------------- show table --------------------------
display(
    err_table.style.format("{:.3e}").set_caption(
        "Absolute error of isometry vs N (5 processes)"
    )
)

# ---------------------- plotting ----------------------------
colour_map = {
    "1": "tab:blue",
    "t": "tab:green",
    "sin(πt)": "tab:red",
    "W_t": "tab:purple",
    "Poisson‑1": "tab:orange",
}
markers = {"1": "o", "t": "s", "sin(πt)": "D", "W_t": "^", "Poisson‑1": "v"}
styles = {"1": "-", "t": "-", "sin(πt)": "-", "W_t": "-", "Poisson‑1": "--"}

plt.figure(figsize=(7, 5))
for col in err_table.columns:
    plt.plot(
        N_list,
        err_table[col],
        marker=markers[col],
        linestyle=styles[col],
        color=colour_map[col],
        label=col,
    )

plt.xscale("log")
plt.yscale("log")
plt.xlabel("time‑step count $N$  (log scale)")
plt.ylabel("absolute error  (log scale)")
plt.title(
    "Convergence of isometry error vs $N$\n"
    "(4 Brownian processes, 1 compensated‑Poisson process)"
)
plt.grid(True, which="both", ls=":")
plt.legend()
plt.tight_layout()
plt.show()

Absolute error of isometry vs N (5 processes)
N	1	t	sin(πt)	W_{t}	Poisson-1
50	3.202e-03	5.356e-03	3.551e-03	1.497e-05	3.625e-02
100	9.887e-03	3.152e-03	7.880e-03	8.480e-03	4.595e-02
200	1.290e-02	6.827e-03	3.569e-03	6.790e-03	2.950e-02
500	3.515e-03	3.692e-04	5.956e-03	6.902e-03	1.780e-02
1000	5.203e-03	5.764e-03	2.894e-04	2.334e-03	3.605e-02
2000	8.342e-03	4.412e-03	2.358e-03	1.208e-02	3.330e-02
5000	5.890e-03	1.908e-03	6.048e-03	1.243e-02	8.335e-02

A Monte Carlo simulation with 20,000 sample paths and 1,000 time steps produces results that closely match the theoretical values predicted by the Itô isometry. As shown in the table above, the absolute errors between the simulated left-hand side $\mathbb{E}[(\int X_t \, dW_t)^2]$ and the analytical right-hand side $\mathbb{E}[\int X_t^2 \, dt]$ are typically on the order of $10^{-3}$ or smaller, confirming the validity of the isometry relationship.

These simulations serve as empirical evidence for the Itô isometry and provide insight into how the relationship holds across different types of processes, both deterministic and stochastic. The close agreement between theoretical and simulated values demonstrates the robustness of the isometry as a fundamental property of stochastic calculus.

== Generalization to Martingales ==
The Itô isometry extends beyond the standard Wiener process to a broader class of stochastic processes, particularly martingales, providing a powerful framework for computing variances of stochastic integrals. A stochastic process $\{X_t\}_{t \geq 0}$ is a martingale with respect to the filtration $\{\mathcal{F}_t\}_{t \geq 0}$ if:

- $\mathbb{E}[X_t|\mathcal{F}_s] = X_s$ for all $t \geq s$

Martingales can be further classified as:

- $L^1$ martingales if $\mathbb{E}[|X_t|] < \infty$ for all $t$
- $L^2$ martingales if $\mathbb{E}[|X_t|^2] < \infty$for all $t$ (and by implication, also $L^1$)

A local martingale is a process $\{X_t\}$ for which there exists a sequence of stopping times $\{\tau_n\}$ with $\tau_n \rightarrow \infty$ such that $\{X_{t \wedge \tau_n}\}$ is a martingale for each $n$.

=== The Itô Isometry for Martingales ===
The Itô integral is defined for a broader class of integrators beyond Brownian motion. For a predictable process $X_t$ and an appropriate integrator $Y_t$, the Itô integral is defined as the limit in $L^2$ of simple predictable processes approximating $X_t$:

$$\int_0^t X_s \, dY_s = \lim_{n \to \infty} \sum_{i=1}^{n-1} \xi_i(Y_{t_{i+1}} - Y_{t_i})$$

where each $\xi_i$ is $\mathcal{F}_{t_i}$-measurable.

The Itô isometry holds when the integrator $Y_t$ is one of:

- An $L^1$ martingale
- An $L^2$ martingale
- A local $L^1$ or $L^2$ martingale

For these cases, the isometry takes the form:

$$\mathbb{E}\left[\left(\int_0^T X_s \, dY_s\right)^2\right] = \mathbb{E}\left[\int_0^T X_s^2 \, d[Y]_s\right]$$

where $[Y]_s$ denotes the quadratic variation process of $Y_s$.
