= Quasimartingale =

A quasimartingale is a concept from stochastic processes and refers to a stochastic process that has finite mean variation. Quasimartingales are generalizing semimartingales in the sense as they do not have to be càdlàg, and they are exactly semimartingales if they are càdlàg. Quasimartingales were introduced by the American mathematician Donald Fisk in 1965.

Some authors use the term as a synonym for semimartingale and assume the process is càdlàg.

== Quasimartingale ==
Let $(\Omega, \mathcal{F}, (\mathcal{F}_t)_{t \geq 0}, P)$ be a filtred probability space and let $\tau$ be a partition of the interval $[0, \infty]$. Further, let $X = (X_t){t \geq 0}$ be an adapted stochastic process. The (mean) variation of $X$ is defined as

$$\operatorname{Var}(X) := \sup\limits_{\tau} \mathbb{E}\left[\sum\limits_{i=0}^n \left|\mathbb{E}[X_{t_i} - X_{t_{i+1}} | \mathcal{F}_{t_i}]\right|\right]$$

The process $X$ is a quasimartingale if $\mathbb{E}[|X_t|] < \infty$ for all $t$ and the process has finite variation:

$\operatorname{Var}(X) < \infty.$

=== Properties ===
- Every semimartingale is a quasimartingale.
- A quasimartingale is a semimartingale if and only if it is càdlàg.
- Rao's theorem is formulated for quasimartingales.
