= Émery topology =

Topology on the space of semimartingales

In martingale theory, Émery topology is a topology on the space of semimartingales. The topology is used in financial mathematics. The class of stochastic integrals with general predictable integrands coincides with the closure of the set of all simple integrals.

The topology was introduced in 1979 by the French mathematician Michel Émery.

== Definition ==
Let $(\Omega,\mathcal{A},\{\mathcal{F_t}\},P)$ be a filtered probability space, where the filtration satisfies the usual conditions and $T\in (0,\infty)$. Let $\mathcal{S}(P)$ be the space of real semimartingales and $\mathcal{E}(1)$ the space of simple predictable processes $H$ with $|H|=1$.

We define

$$\|X\|_{\mathcal{S}(P)}:=\sup\limits_{H\in \mathcal{E}(1)}\mathbb{E}\left[1\wedge \left(\sup\limits_{t\in[0,T]}|(H\cdot X)_t|\right)\right].$$

Then $(\mathcal{S}(P),d)$ with the metric $d(X,Y):=\|X-Y\|_{\mathcal{S}(P)}$ is a complete metric space and the induced topology is called Émery topology.
