= Progressively measurable process =

Property in the mathematical theory of stochastic processes

In mathematics, progressive measurability is a property in the theory of stochastic processes. A progressively measurable process, while defined quite technically, is important because it implies the stopped process is measurable. Being progressively measurable is a strictly stronger property than the notion of being an adapted process. Progressively measurable processes are important in the theory of Itô integrals.

== Definition ==
Let

- $(\Omega, \mathcal{F}, \mathbb{P})$ be a probability space;
- $(\mathbb{X}, \mathcal{A})$ be a measurable space, the state space;
- $\{ \mathcal{F}_{t} \mid t \geq 0 \}$ be a filtration of the sigma algebra $\mathcal{F}$;
- $X : [0, \infty) \times \Omega \to \mathbb{X}$ be a stochastic process (the index set could be $[0, T]$ or $\mathbb{N}_{0}$ instead of $[0, \infty)$);
- $\mathrm{Borel}([0, t])$ be the Borel sigma algebra on $[0,t]$.

The process $X$ is said to be progressively measurable (or simply progressive) if, for every time $t$, the map $[0, t] \times \Omega \to \mathbb{X}$ defined by $(s, \omega) \mapsto X_{s} (\omega)$ is $\mathrm{Borel}([0, t]) \otimes \mathcal{F}_{t}$-measurable. This implies that $X$ is $\mathcal{F}_{t}$-adapted.

A subset $P \subseteq [0, \infty) \times \Omega$ is said to be progressively measurable if the process $X_{s} (\omega) := \chi_{P} (s, \omega)$ is progressively measurable in the sense defined above, where $\chi_{P}$ is the indicator function of $P$. The set of all such subsets $P$ form a sigma algebra on $[0, \infty) \times \Omega$, denoted by $\mathrm{Prog}$, and a process $X$ is progressively measurable in the sense of the previous paragraph if, and only if, it is $\mathrm{Prog}$-measurable.

== Properties ==
- It can be shown that $L^2 (B)$, the space of stochastic processes $X : [0, T] \times \Omega \to \mathbb{R}^n$ for which the Itô integral

$$\int_0^T X_t \, \mathrm{d} B_t$$

with respect to Brownian motion $B$ is defined, is the set of equivalence classes of $\mathrm{Prog}$-measurable processes in $L^2 ([0, T] \times \Omega; \mathbb{R}^n)$.

- Every adapted process with left- or right-continuous paths is progressively measurable. Consequently, every adapted process with càdlàg paths is progressively measurable.
- Every measurable and adapted process has a progressively measurable modification.
