= Local martingale =

Type of stochastic process

In mathematics, a local martingale is a type of stochastic process, satisfying the localized version of the martingale property. Every martingale is a local martingale; every bounded local martingale is a martingale; in particular, every local martingale that is bounded from below is a supermartingale, and every local martingale that is bounded from above is a submartingale; however, a local martingale is not in general a martingale, because its expectation can be distorted by large values of small probability. In particular, a driftless diffusion process is a local martingale, but not necessarily a martingale.

Local martingales are essential in stochastic analysis (see Itô calculus, semimartingale, and Girsanov theorem).

== Definition ==
Let $(\Omega,F,P)$ be a probability space; let $F_*=\{F_t\mid t\geq 0\}$ be a filtration of $F$; let $X\colon [0,\infty)\times \Omega \rightarrow S$ be an $F_*$-adapted stochastic process on the set $S$. Then $X$ is called an $F_*$-local martingale if there exists a sequence of $F_*$-stopping times $\tau_k \colon \Omega \to [0,\infty)$ such that

- the $\tau_k$ are almost surely increasing: $P\left\{\tau_k < \tau_{k+1} \right\}=1$;
- the $\tau_k$ diverge almost surely: $P \left\{\lim_{k\to\infty} \tau_k =\infty \right\}=1$;
- the stopped process
  $$X_t^{\tau_k} := X_{\min \{ t, \tau_k \}}$$
  is an $F_*$-martingale for every $k$.

== Examples ==
=== Example 1 ===
Illustration for local martingale. Up Panel: Multiple simulated paths of the process $X_t$ which is stopped upon hitting $-1$. This shows gambler's ruin behavior, and is not a martingale. Down Panel: Paths of $X_t$ with an additional stopping criterion: the process is also stopped when it reaches a magnitude of $k = 2.0$. This no longer suffers from gambler's ruin behavior, and is a martingale.

Let W_{t} be the Wiener process and T = min{ t : W_{t} = −1 } the time of first hit of −1. The stopped process W_{min{ t, T }} is a martingale. Its expectation is 0 at all times; nevertheless, its limit (as t → ∞) is equal to −1 almost surely (a kind of gambler's ruin). A time change leads to a process

$$\displaystyle X_t = \begin{cases}
W_{\min\left(\tfrac{t}{1-t},T\right)} &\text{for } 0 \le t < 1,\\
-1 &\text{for } 1 \le t < \infty.
\end{cases}$$

The process $X_t$ is continuous almost surely; nevertheless, its expectation is discontinuous,

$$\displaystyle \operatorname{E} X_t = \begin{cases}
0 &\text{for } 0 \le t < 1,\\
-1 &\text{for } 1 \le t < \infty.
\end{cases}$$

This process is not a martingale. However, it is a local martingale. A localizing sequence may be chosen as $\tau_k = \min \{ t : X_t = k \}$ if there is such t, otherwise $\tau_k = k$. This sequence diverges almost surely, since $\tau_k = k$ for all k large enough (namely, for all k that exceed the maximal value of the process X). The process stopped at τ_{k} is a martingale. (Note: For the times before 1 it is a martingale since a stopped Brownian motion is. After the instant 1 it is constant. It remains to check it at the instant 1. By the bounded convergence theorem the expectation at 1 is the limit of the expectation at (n-1)/n (as n tends to infinity), and the latter does not depend on n. The same argument applies to the conditional expectation.)

=== Example 2 ===
Let W_{t} be the Wiener process and ƒ a measurable function such that $\operatorname{E} |f(W_1)| < \infty.$ Then the following process is a martingale:

$$X_t = \operatorname{E} ( f(W_1) \mid F_t ) = \begin{cases}
f_{1-t}(W_t) &\text{for } 0 \le t < 1,\\
f(W_1) &\text{for } 1 \le t < \infty;
\end{cases}$$

where

$$f_s(x) = \operatorname{E} f(x+W_s) = \int f(x+y) \frac1{\sqrt{2\pi s}} \mathrm{e}^{-y^2/(2s)} \, dy.$$

The Dirac delta function $\delta$ (strictly speaking, not a function), being used in place of $f,$ leads to a process defined informally as $Y_t = \operatorname{E} ( \delta(W_1) \mid F_t )$ and formally as

$$Y_t = \begin{cases}
\delta_{1-t}(W_t) &\text{for } 0 \le t < 1,\\
0 &\text{for } 1 \le t < \infty,
\end{cases}$$

where

$$\delta_s(x) = \frac1{\sqrt{2\pi s}} \mathrm{e}^{-x^2/(2s)} .$$

The process $Y_t$ is continuous almost surely (since $W_1 \ne 0$ almost surely), nevertheless, its expectation is discontinuous,

$$\operatorname{E} Y_t = \begin{cases}
1/\sqrt{2\pi} &\text{for } 0 \le t < 1,\\
0 &\text{for } 1 \le t < \infty.
\end{cases}$$

This process is not a martingale. However, it is a local martingale. A localizing sequence may be chosen as $\tau_k = \min \{ t : Y_t = k \}.$

=== Example 3 ===
Let $Z_t$ be the complex-valued Wiener process, and

$$X_t = \ln | Z_t - 1 | \, .$$

The process $X_t$ is continuous almost surely (since $Z_t$ does not hit 1, almost surely), and is a local martingale, since the function $u \mapsto \ln|u-1|$ is harmonic (on the complex plane without the point 1). A localizing sequence may be chosen as $\tau_k = \min \{ t : X_t = -k \}.$ Nevertheless, the expectation of this process is non-constant; moreover,

$\operatorname{E} X_t \to \infty$ as $t \to \infty,$

which can be deduced from the fact that the mean value of $\ln|u-1|$ over the circle $|u|=r$ tends to infinity as $r \to \infty$. (In fact, it is equal to $\ln r$ for r ≥ 1 but to 0 for r ≤ 1).

== Martingales via local martingales ==
Let $M_t$ be a local martingale. In order to prove that it is a martingale it is sufficient to prove that $M_t^{\tau_k} \to M_t$ in L^{1} (as $k \to \infty$) for every t, that is, $\operatorname{E} | M_t^{\tau_k} - M_t | \to 0;$ here $M_t^{\tau_k} = M_{t\wedge \tau_k}$ is the stopped process. The given relation $\tau_k \to \infty$ implies that $M_t^{\tau_k} \to M_t$ almost surely. The dominated convergence theorem ensures the convergence in L^{1} provided that

$\textstyle (*) \quad \operatorname{E} \sup_k| M_t^{\tau_k} | < \infty$ for every t.

Thus, Condition (*) is sufficient for a local martingale $M_t$ being a martingale. A stronger condition

$\textstyle (**) \quad \operatorname{E} \sup_{s\in[0,t]} |M_s| < \infty$ for every t

is also sufficient.

Caution. The weaker condition

$\textstyle \sup_{s\in[0,t]} \operatorname{E} |M_s| < \infty$ for every t

is not sufficient. Moreover, the condition

$$\textstyle \sup_{t\in[0,\infty)} \operatorname{E} \mathrm{e}^{|M_t|} < \infty$$

is still not sufficient; for a counterexample see Example 3 above.

A special case:

$$\textstyle M_t = f(t,W_t),$$

where $W_t$ is the Wiener process, and $f : [0,\infty) \times \mathbb{R} \to \mathbb{R}$ is twice continuously differentiable. The process $M_t$ is a local martingale if and only if f satisfies the PDE

$$\Big( \frac{\partial}{\partial t} + \frac12 \frac{\partial^2}{\partial x^2} \Big) f(t,x) = 0.$$

However, this PDE itself does not ensure that $M_t$ is a martingale. In order to apply (**) the following condition on f is sufficient: for every $\varepsilon>0$ and t there exists $C = C(\varepsilon,t)$ such that

$$\textstyle |f(s,x)| \le C \mathrm{e}^{\varepsilon x^2}$$

for all $s \in [0,t]$ and $x \in \mathbb{R}.$
