= Yamada–Watanabe theorem =

Theorem in probability theory

The Yamada–Watanabe theorem is a result from probability theory saying that for a large class of stochastic differential equations a weak solution with pathwise uniqueness implies a strong solution and uniqueness in distribution. In its original form, the theorem was stated for $n$-dimensional Itô equations and was proven by Toshio Yamada and Shinzo Watanabe in 1971. Since then, many generalizations appeared particularly one for general semimartingales by Jean Jacod from 1980.

== Yamada–Watanabe theorem ==
=== History, generalizations and related results ===
Jean Jacod generalized the result to SDEs of the form

$$dX_t=u(X,Z)dZ_t,$$

where $(Z_t)_{t\geq 0}$ is a semimartingale and the coefficient $u$ can depend on the path of $Z$.

Further generalisations were done by Hans-Jürgen Engelbert (1991) and Thomas G. Kurtz (2007). For SDEs in Banach spaces there is a result from Martin Ondrejat (2004), one by Michael Röckner, Byron Schmuland and Xicheng Zhang (2008) and one by Stefan Tappe (2013).

The converse of the theorem is also true and called the dual Yamada–Watanabe theorem. The first version of this theorem was proven by Engelbert (1991) and a more general version by Alexander Cherny (2002).

=== Setting ===
Let $n,r\in\mathbb{N}$ and $C(\R_+,\R^n)$ be the space of continuous functions. Consider the $n$-dimensional Itô equation

$$dX_t=b(t,X)dt+\sigma(t,X)dW_t,\quad X_0=x_0$$

where

- $b\colon \R_+\times C(\R_+,\R^n)\to\R^n$ and $\sigma \colon \R_+\times C(\R_+,\R^n)\to\R^{n\times r}$ are predictable processes,
- $(W_t)_{t\geq 0}=\left((W^{(1)}_t,\dots,W^{(r)}_t)\right)_{t\geq 0}$ is an $r$-dimensional Brownian Motion,
- $x_0\in \R^n$ is deterministic.

=== Basic terminology ===
We say uniqueness in distribution (or weak uniqueness), if for two arbitrary solutions $(X^{(1)},W^{(1)})$ and $(X^{(2)},W^{(2)})$ defined on (possibly different) filtered probability spaces $(\Omega_1,\mathcal{F}_1,\mathbf{F}_1,P_1)$ and $(\Omega_2,\mathcal{F}_2,\mathbf{F}_2,P_2)$, we have for their distributions $P_{X^{(1)}}=P_{X^{(2)}}$, where $P_{X^{(1)}}:=\operatorname{Law}(X_t^{1},t\geq 0)$.

We say pathwise uniqueness (or strong uniqueness) if any two solutions $(X^{(1)},W)$ and $(X^{(2)},W)$, defined on the same filtered probability spaces $(\Omega,\mathcal{F},\mathbf{F},P)$ with the same $\mathbf{F}$-Brownian motion, are indistinguishable processes, i.e. we have $P$-almost surely that $\{X_t^{(1)}=X_t^{(2)},t\geq 0\}$

=== Theorem ===
Assume the described setting above is valid, then the theorem is:

If there is pathwise uniqueness, then there is also uniqueness in distribution. And if for every initial distribution, there exists a weak solution, then for every initial distribution, also a pathwise unique strong solution exists.

Jacod's result improved the statement with the additional statement that

If a weak solutions exists and pathwise uniqueness holds, then this solution is also a strong solution.
