= Martingale representation theorem =

Theorem in probability theory

In probability theory, the martingale representation theorem states that a random variable with finite variance that is measurable with respect to the filtration generated by a Brownian motion can be written in terms of an Itô integral with respect to this Brownian motion.

The theorem only asserts the existence of the representation and does not help to find it explicitly; it is possible in many cases to determine the form of the representation using Malliavin calculus.

Similar theorems also exist for martingales on filtrations induced by jump processes, for example, by Markov chains.

== Statement ==
Let $B_t$ be a Brownian motion on a standard filtered probability space $(\Omega, \mathcal{F},\mathcal{F}_t, P )$ and let $\mathcal{G}_t$ be the augmented filtration generated by $B$. If X is a square integrable random variable measurable with respect to $\mathcal{G}_\infty$, then there exists a predictable process C which is adapted with respect to $\mathcal{G}_t,$ such that

$$X = E(X) + \int_0^\infty C_s\,dB_s.$$

Consequently,

$$E(X| \mathcal{G}_t) = E(X) + \int_0^t C_s \, d B_s.$$

== Application in finance ==
The martingale representation theorem can be used to establish the existence of a hedging strategy. Suppose that $\left ( M_t \right )_{0 \le t < \infty}$ is a Q-martingale process, whose volatility $\sigma_t$ is always non-zero. Then, if $\left ( N_t \right )_{0 \le t < \infty}$ is any other Q-martingale, there exists an $\mathcal{F}$-previsible process $\varphi$, unique up to sets of measure 0, such that $\int_0^T \varphi_t^2 \sigma_t^2 \, dt < \infty$ with probability one, and N can be written as:

$$N_t = N_0 + \int_0^t \varphi_s\, d M_s.$$

The replicating strategy is defined to be:

- hold $\varphi_t$ units of the stock at the time t, and
- hold $\psi_t B_t = C_t - \varphi_t Z_t$ units of the bond.

where $Z_t$ is the stock price discounted by the bond price to time $t$ and $C_t$ is the expected payoff of the option at time $t$.

At the expiration day T, the value of the portfolio is:

$$V_T = \varphi_T S_T + \psi_T B_T = C_T = X$$

and it is easy to check that the strategy is self-financing: the change in the value of the portfolio only depends on the change of the asset prices $\left ( dV_t = \varphi_t \, dS_t + \psi_t\, dB_t \right )$.

== See also ==
- Backward stochastic differential equation
