= Itô calculus =

Calculus of stochastic differential equations

Itô integral Y_{t}(B) (blue) of a Brownian motion B (red) with respect to itself, i.e., both the integrand and the integrator are Brownian. It turns out Y_{t}(B) = (B^{2} − t)/2.

Itô calculus, named after Kiyosi Itô, extends the methods of calculus to stochastic processes such as Brownian motion (see Wiener process). It has important applications in mathematical finance, in stochastic differential equations, and more recently even in machine learning.

The central concept is the Itô stochastic integral, a stochastic generalization of the Riemann–Stieltjes integral in analysis. The integrands and the integrators are now stochastic processes:
$$Y_t = \int_0^t H_s\,dX_s,$$
where H is a locally square-integrable process adapted to the filtration generated by X, which is a Brownian motion or, more generally, a semimartingale. The result of the integration is then another stochastic process. Concretely, the integral from 0 to any particular t is a random variable, defined as a limit of a certain sequence of random variables. The paths of Brownian motion fail to satisfy the requirements to be able to apply the standard techniques of calculus. So with the integrand a stochastic process, the Itô stochastic integral amounts to an integral with respect to a function which is not differentiable at any point and has infinite variation over every time interval. The main insight is that the integral can be defined as long as the integrand H is adapted, which loosely speaking means that its value at time t can only depend on information available up until this time. Roughly speaking, one chooses a sequence of partitions of the interval from 0 to t and constructs Riemann sums. Every time we are computing a Riemann sum, we are using a particular instantiation of the integrator. It is crucial which point in each of the small intervals is used to compute the value of the function. The limit then is taken in probability as the mesh of the partition is going to zero. Numerous technical details have to be taken care of to show that this limit exists and is independent of the particular sequence of partitions. Typically, the left end of the interval is used.

Important results of Itô calculus include the integration by parts formula and Itô's lemma, which is a change of variables formula. These differ from the formulas of standard calculus, due to quadratic variation terms. This can be contrasted to the Stratonovich integral as an alternative formulation; it does follow the chain rule, and does not require Itô's lemma. The two integral forms can be converted to one-another. The Stratonovich integral is obtained as the limiting form of a Riemann sum that employs the average of stochastic variable over each small timestep, whereas the Itô integral considers it only at the beginning.

In mathematical finance, the described evaluation strategy of the integral is conceptualized as that we are first deciding what to do, then observing the change in the prices. The integrand is how much stock we hold, the integrator represents the movement of the prices, and the integral is how much money we have in total including what our stock is worth, at any given moment. The prices of stocks and other traded financial assets can be modeled by stochastic processes such as Brownian motion or, more often, geometric Brownian motion (see Black–Scholes). Then, the Itô stochastic integral represents the payoff of a continuous-time trading strategy consisting of holding an amount H_{t} of the stock at time t. In this situation, the condition that H is adapted corresponds to the necessary restriction that the trading strategy can only make use of the available information at any time. This prevents the possibility of unlimited gains through clairvoyance: buying the stock just before each uptick in the market and selling before each downtick. Similarly, the condition that H is adapted implies that the stochastic integral will not diverge when calculated as a limit of Riemann sums.

== Notation ==
The process Y defined before as
$$Y_t = \int_0^t H\,dX\equiv\int_0^t H_s\,dX_s ,$$
is itself a stochastic process with time parameter t, which is also sometimes written as Y = H · X. Alternatively, the integral is often written in differential form dY = H dX, which is equivalent to Y − Y_{0} = H · X. As Itô calculus is concerned with continuous-time stochastic processes, it is assumed that an underlying filtered probability space is given
$$(\Omega,\mathcal{F},(\mathcal{F}_t)_{t\ge 0},\mathbb{P}) .$$
The σ-algebra $\mathcal{F}_t$ represents the information available up until time t, and a process X is adapted if X_{t} is $\mathcal{F}_t$-measurable. A Brownian motion B is understood to be an $\mathcal{F}_t$-Brownian motion, which is just a standard Brownian motion with the properties that B_{t} is $\mathcal{F}_t$-measurable and that B_{t+s} − B_{t} is independent of $\mathcal{F}_t$ for all s,t ≥ 0.

== Integration with respect to Brownian motion ==
The Itô integral can be defined in a manner similar to the Riemann–Stieltjes integral, that is as a limit in probability of Riemann sums; such a limit does not necessarily exist pathwise. Suppose that B is a Wiener process (Brownian motion) and that H is a right-continuous (càdlàg), adapted and locally bounded process. If $\{\pi_n\}$ is a sequence of partitions of [0, t] with mesh width going to zero, then the Itô integral of H with respect to B up to time t is a random variable
$$\int_0^t H \,d B =\lim_{n\rightarrow\infty} \sum_{[t_{i-1},t_i]\in\pi_n}H_{t_{i-1}}(B_{t_i}-B_{t_{i-1}}).$$

It can be shown that this limit converges in probability.

For some applications, such as martingale representation theorems and local times, the integral is needed for processes that are not continuous. The predictable processes form the smallest class that is closed under taking limits of sequences and contains all adapted left-continuous processes. If H is any predictable process such that ∫_{0}^{t} H^{2} ds < ∞ for every t ≥ 0 then the integral of H with respect to B can be defined, and H is said to be B-integrable. Any such process can be approximated by a sequence H_{n} of left-continuous, adapted and locally bounded processes, in the sense that
$$\int_0^t (H-H_n)^2\,ds\to 0$$
in probability. Then, the Itô integral is
$$\int_0^t H\,dB = \lim_{n\to\infty}\int_0^t H_n\,dB$$
where, again, the limit can be shown to converge in probability. The stochastic integral satisfies the Itô isometry
$$\mathbb{E}\left[ \left(\int_0^t H_s \, dB_s\right)^2\right] = \mathbb{E} \left[ \int_0^t H_s^2\,ds\right ]$$
which holds when H is bounded or, more generally, when the integral on the right hand side is finite.

== Itô processes ==
A single realization of an Itô process with μ = 0 and σ = ψ(t−5), where ψ is the Ricker wavelet. Off the tide of the wavelet, the motion of the Itô process is stable.

An Itô process is defined to be an adapted stochastic process that can be expressed as the sum of an integral with respect to Brownian motion and an integral with respect to time,
$$X_t=X_0+\int_0^t\sigma_s\,dB_s + \int_0^t\mu_s\,ds.$$

Here, B is a Brownian motion and it is required that σ is a predictable B-integrable process, and μ is predictable and (Lebesgue) integrable. That is,
$$\int_0^t(\sigma_s^2+|\mu_s|)\,ds<\infty$$
for each t. The stochastic integral can be extended to such Itô processes,
$$\int_0^t H\,dX =\int_0^t H_s\sigma_s\,dB_s + \int_0^t H_s\mu_s\,ds.$$

This is defined for all locally bounded and predictable integrands. More generally, it is required that Hσ be B-integrable and Hμ be Lebesgue integrable, so that
$$\int_0^t \left(H^2 \sigma^2 + |H\mu| \right) ds < \infty.$$
Such predictable processes H are called X-integrable.

An important result for the study of Itô processes is Itô's lemma. In its simplest form, for any twice continuously differentiable function f on the reals and Itô process X as described above, it states that $Y_t=f(X_t)$ is itself an Itô process satisfying
$$d Y_t = f^\prime(X_t) \mu_t\,d t + \tfrac{1}{2} f^{\prime\prime} (X_t) \sigma_t^2 \, d t
+ f^\prime(X_t) \sigma_t \,dB_t .$$

This is the stochastic calculus version of the change of variables formula and chain rule. It differs from the standard result due to the additional term involving the second derivative of f, which comes from the property that Brownian motion has non-zero quadratic variation.

== Semimartingales as integrators ==
The Itô integral is defined with respect to a semimartingale X. These are processes which can be decomposed as X = M + A for a local martingale M and finite variation process A. Important examples of such processes include Brownian motion, which is a martingale, and Lévy processes. For a left continuous, locally bounded and adapted process H the integral H · X exists, and can be calculated as a limit of Riemann sums. Let π_{n} be a sequence of partitions of [0, t] with mesh going to zero,
$$\int_0^t H\,dX = \lim_{n\to\infty} \sum_{t_{i-1},t_i\in\pi_n}H_{t_{i-1}}(X_{t_i}-X_{t_{i-1}}).$$

This limit converges in probability. The stochastic integral of left-continuous processes is general enough for studying much of stochastic calculus. For example, it is sufficient for applications of Itô's Lemma, changes of measure via Girsanov's theorem, and for the study of stochastic differential equations. However, it is inadequate for other important topics such as martingale representation theorems and local times.

The integral extends to all predictable and locally bounded integrands, in a unique way, such that the dominated convergence theorem holds. That is, if H_{n} → H and |H_{n}| ≤ J for a locally bounded process J, then
$$\int_0^t H_n \,dX \to \int_0^t H \,dX,$$
in probability. The uniqueness of the extension from left-continuous to predictable integrands is a result of the monotone class lemma.

In general, the stochastic integral H · X can be defined even in cases where the predictable process H is not locally bounded. If K = 1 / (1 + |H|) then K and KH are bounded. Associativity of stochastic integration implies that H is X-integrable, with integral H · X = Y, if and only if Y_{0} = 0 and K · Y = (KH) · X. The set of X-integrable processes is denoted by L(X).

== Properties ==
The following properties can be found in works such as Revuz & Yor (1999) and Rogers & Williams (2000):

- The stochastic integral is a càdlàg process. Furthermore, it is a semimartingale.
- The discontinuities of the stochastic integral are given by the jumps of the integrator multiplied by the integrand. The jump of a càdlàg process at a time t is X_{t} − X_{t−}, and is often denoted by ΔX_{t}. With this notation, Δ(H · X) = H ΔX. A particular consequence of this is that integrals with respect to a continuous process are always themselves continuous.
- Associativity. Let J, K be predictable processes, and K be X-integrable. Then, J is K · X integrable if and only if JK is X-integrable, in which case
  $$J\cdot (K\cdot X) = (JK)\cdot X$$
- Dominated convergence. Suppose that H_{n} → H and |H_{n}| ≤ J, where J is an X-integrable process. then H_{n} · X → H · X. Convergence is in probability at each time t. In fact, it converges uniformly on compact sets in probability.
- The stochastic integral commutes with the operation of taking quadratic covariations. If X and Y are semimartingales then any X-integrable process will also be [X, Y]-integrable, and [H · X, Y] = H · [X, Y]. A consequence of this is that the quadratic variation process of a stochastic integral is equal to an integral of a quadratic variation process,
  $$[H\cdot X] = H^2\cdot[X]$$

== Integration by parts ==
As with ordinary calculus, integration by parts is an important result in stochastic calculus. The integration by parts formula for the Itô integral differs from the standard result due to the inclusion of a quadratic covariation term. This term comes from the fact that Itô calculus deals with processes with non-zero quadratic variation, which only occurs for infinite variation processes (such as Brownian motion). If X and Y are semimartingales then
$$X_t Y_t = X_0 Y_0 + \int_0^t X_{s-} \, dY_s + \int_0^t Y_{s-} \, dX_s + [X,Y]_t$$
where [X, Y] is the quadratic covariation process.

The result is similar to the integration by parts theorem for the Riemann–Stieltjes integral but has an additional quadratic variation term.

== Itô's lemma ==
Itô's lemma is the version of the chain rule or change of variables formula which applies to the Itô integral. It is one of the most powerful and frequently used theorems in stochastic calculus. For a continuous n-dimensional semimartingale X = (X^{1},...,X^{n}) and twice continuously differentiable function f from R^{n} to R, it states that f(X) is a semimartingale and,
$$df(X_t)= \sum_{i=1}^n f_{i}(X_t)\,dX^i_t + \frac{1}{2} \sum_{i,j=1}^n f_{i,j}(X_{t}) \, d[X^i,X^j]_t.$$
This differs from the chain rule used in standard calculus due to the term involving the quadratic covariation [X^{i},X^{j} ]. The formula can be generalized to include an explicit time-dependence in $f,$ and in other ways (see Itô's lemma).

== Martingale integrators ==
=== Local martingales ===
An important property of the Itô integral is that it preserves the local martingale property. If M is a local martingale and H is a locally bounded predictable process then H · M is also a local martingale. For integrands which are not locally bounded, there are examples where H · M is not a local martingale. However, this can only occur when M is not continuous. If M is a continuous local martingale then a predictable process H is M-integrable if and only if
$$\int_0^t H^2 \, d[M] <\infty,$$
for each t, and H · M is always a local martingale.

The most general statement for a discontinuous local martingale M is that if (H^{2} · [M])^{1/2} is locally integrable then H · M exists and is a local martingale.

=== Square integrable martingales ===
For bounded integrands, the Itô stochastic integral preserves the space of square integrable martingales, which is the set of càdlàg martingales M such that E[M_{t}^{2}] is finite for all t. For any such square integrable martingale M, the quadratic variation process [M] is integrable, and the Itô isometry states that
$$\mathbb{E}\left [(H\cdot M_t)^2\right ]=\mathbb{E}\left [\int_0^t H^2\,d[M]\right ].$$
This equality holds more generally for any martingale M such that H^{2} · [M]_{t} is integrable. The Itô isometry is often used as an important step in the construction of the stochastic integral, by defining H · M to be the unique extension of this isometry from a certain class of simple integrands to all bounded and predictable processes.

=== p-Integrable martingales ===
For any p > 1, and bounded predictable integrand, the stochastic integral preserves the space of p-integrable martingales. These are càdlàg martingales such that E(|M_{t}|^{p}) is finite for all t. However, this is not always true in the case where p = 1. There are examples of integrals of bounded predictable processes with respect to martingales which are not themselves martingales.

The maximum process of a càdlàg process M is written as M*_{t} = sup_{s ≤t} |M_{s}|. For any p ≥ 1 and bounded predictable integrand, the stochastic integral preserves the space of càdlàg martingales M such that E[(M*_{t})^{p}] is finite for all t. If p > 1 then this is the same as the space of p-integrable martingales, by Doob's inequalities.

The Burkholder–Davis–Gundy inequalities state that, for any given p ≥ 1, there exist positive constants c, C that depend on p, but not M or on t such that
$$c\mathbb{E} \left [ [M]_t^{\frac{p}{2}} \right ] \le \mathbb{E}\left [(M^*_t)^p \right ]\le C\mathbb{E}\left [ [M]_t^{\frac{p}{2}} \right ]$$
for all càdlàg local martingales M. These are used to show that if (M*_{t})^{p} is integrable and H is a bounded predictable process then
$$\mathbb{E}\left [ ((H\cdot M)_t^*)^p \right ] \le C\mathbb{E}\left [(H^2\cdot[M]_t)^{\frac{p}{2}} \right ] < \infty$$
and, consequently, H · M is a p-integrable martingale. More generally, this statement is true whenever (H^{2} · [M])^{p/2} is integrable.

== Existence of the integral ==
Proofs that the Itô integral is well defined typically proceed by first looking at very simple integrands, such as piecewise constant, left continuous and adapted processes where the integral can be written explicitly. Such simple predictable processes are linear combinations of terms of the form H_{t} = A1_{{t > T}} for stopping times T and F_{T}-measurable random variables A, for which the integral is
$$H\cdot X_t\equiv \mathbf{1}_{\{t>T\}}A(X_t-X_T).$$
This is extended to all simple predictable processes by the linearity of H · X in H.

For a Brownian motion B, the property that it has independent increments with zero mean and variance Var(B_{t}) = t can be used to prove the Itô isometry for simple predictable integrands,
$$\mathbb{E} \left [ (H\cdot B_t)^2\right ] = \mathbb{E} \left [\int_0^tH_s^2\,ds\right ].$$
By a continuous linear extension, the integral extends uniquely to all predictable integrands satisfying
$$\mathbb{E} \left[ \int_0^t H^2 \, ds \right ] < \infty,$$
in such way that the Itô isometry still holds. It can then be extended to all B-integrable processes by localization. This method allows the integral to be defined with respect to any Itô process.

For a general semimartingale X, the decomposition X = M + A into a local martingale M plus a finite variation process A can be used. Then, the integral can be shown to exist separately with respect to M and A and combined using linearity, H · X = H · M + H · A, to get the integral with respect to X. The standard Lebesgue–Stieltjes integral allows integration to be defined with respect to finite variation processes, so the existence of the Itô integral for semimartingales will follow from any construction for local martingales.

For a càdlàg square integrable martingale M, a generalized form of the Itô isometry can be used. First, the Doob–Meyer decomposition theorem is used to show that a decomposition M^{2} = N + ⟨M⟩ exists, where N is a martingale and ⟨M⟩ is a right-continuous, increasing and predictable process starting at zero. This uniquely defines ⟨M⟩, which is referred to as the predictable quadratic variation of M. The Itô isometry for square integrable martingales is then
$$\mathbb{E} \left [(H\cdot M_t)^2\right ]= \mathbb{E} \left [\int_0^tH^2_s\,d\langle M\rangle_s\right],$$
which can be proved directly for simple predictable integrands. As with the case above for Brownian motion, a continuous linear extension can be used to uniquely extend to all predictable integrands satisfying E[H^{2} · ⟨M⟩_{t}] < ∞. This method can be extended to all local square integrable martingales by localization. Finally, the Doob–Meyer decomposition can be used to decompose any local martingale into the sum of a local square integrable martingale and a finite variation process, allowing the Itô integral to be constructed with respect to any semimartingale.

Many other proofs exist which apply similar methods but which avoid the need to use the Doob–Meyer decomposition theorem, such as the use of the quadratic variation [M] in the Itô isometry, the use of the Doléans measure for submartingales, or the use of the Burkholder–Davis–Gundy inequalities instead of the Itô isometry. The latter applies directly to local martingales without having to first deal with the square integrable martingale case.

Alternative proofs exist only making use of the fact that X is càdlàg, adapted, and the set {H · X_{t}: |H| ≤ 1 is simple previsible} is bounded in probability for each time t, which is an alternative definition for X to be a semimartingale. A continuous linear extension can be used to construct the integral for all left-continuous and adapted integrands with right limits everywhere (caglad or L-processes). This is general enough to be able to apply techniques such as Itô's lemma. Also, a Khintchine inequality can be used to prove the dominated convergence theorem and extend the integral to general predictable integrands.

== Differentiation in Itô calculus ==
The Itô calculus is first and foremost defined as an integral calculus as outlined above. However, there are also different notions of "derivative" with respect to Brownian motion:

=== Malliavin derivative ===
Malliavin calculus provides a theory of differentiation for random variables defined over Wiener space, including an integration by parts formula.

=== Martingale representation ===
The following result allows to express martingales as Itô integrals: if M is a square-integrable martingale on a time interval [0, T] with respect to the filtration generated by a Brownian motion B, then there is a unique adapted square integrable process $\alpha$ on [0, T] such that
$$M_{t} = M_{0} + \int_{0}^{t} \alpha_{s} \, \mathrm{d} B_{s}$$
almost surely, and for all t ∈ [0, T]. This representation theorem can be interpreted formally as saying that α is the "time derivative" of M with respect to Brownian motion B, since α is precisely the process that must be integrated up to time t to obtain M_{t} − M_{0}, as in deterministic calculus.

== Itô calculus for physicists ==
In physics, usually stochastic differential equations (SDEs), such as Langevin equations, are used, rather than stochastic integrals. Here an Itô stochastic differential equation (SDE) is often formulated via
$$\dot{x}_k = h_k + g_{kl} \xi_l,$$
where $\xi_j$ is Gaussian white noise with
$$\langle\xi_k(t_1)\,\xi_l(t_2)\rangle = \delta_{kl}\delta(t_1-t_2)$$
and Einstein's summation convention is used.

If $y = y(x_k)$ is a function of the x_{k}, then Itô's lemma has to be used:
$$\dot{y}=\frac{\partial y}{\partial x_j}\dot{x}_j+\frac{1}{2}\frac{\partial^2 y}{\partial x_k \, \partial x_l} g_{km}g_{ml}.$$

An Itô SDE as above also corresponds to a Stratonovich SDE which reads
$$\dot{x}_k = h_k + g_{kl} \xi_l - \frac{1}{2} \frac{\partial g_{kl}}{\partial {x_m}} g_{ml}.$$

SDEs frequently occur in physics in Stratonovich form, as limits of stochastic differential equations driven by colored noise if the correlation time of the noise term approaches zero. For a recent treatment of different interpretations of stochastic differential equations see for example Lau & Lubensky (2007).

== See also ==
- Stochastic calculus
- Itô's lemma
- Otto calculus
- Stratonovich integral
- Semimartingale
- Wiener process
