= Stochastic calculus =

Calculus on stochastic processes

Stochastic calculus is a branch of mathematics that operates on stochastic processes. It allows a consistent theory of integration to be defined for integrals of stochastic processes with respect to stochastic processes. This field was created and started by the Japanese mathematician Kiyosi Itô during World War II.

The best-known stochastic process to which stochastic calculus is applied is the Wiener process (named in honor of Norbert Wiener), which is used for modeling Brownian motion as described by Louis Bachelier in 1900 and by Albert Einstein in 1905 and other physical diffusion processes in space of particles subject to random forces. Since the 1970s, the Wiener process has been widely applied in financial mathematics and economics to model the evolution in time of stock prices and bond interest rates.

The main flavours of stochastic calculus are the Itô calculus and its variational relative the Malliavin calculus. For technical reasons the Itô integral is the most useful for general classes of processes, but the related Stratonovich integral is frequently useful in problem formulation (particularly in engineering disciplines). The Stratonovich integral can readily be expressed in terms of the Itô integral, and vice versa. The main benefit of the Stratonovich integral is that it obeys the usual chain rule and therefore does not require Itô's lemma. This enables problems to be expressed in a coordinate system invariant form, which is invaluable when developing stochastic calculus on manifolds other than R^{n}. The dominated convergence theorem does not hold for the Stratonovich integral; consequently it is very difficult to prove results without re-expressing the integrals in Itô form.

== Itô integral ==
The Itô integral is central to the study of stochastic calculus. The integral $\int H\,dX$ is defined for a semimartingale X and locally bounded predictable process H.

== Stratonovich integral ==
The Stratonovich integral or Fisk–Stratonovich integral of a semimartingale $X$ against another semimartingale Y can be defined in terms of the Itô integral as

$$\int_0^t X_{s-} \circ d Y_s : = \int_0^t X_{s-} d Y_s + \frac{1}{2} \left [ X, Y\right]_t^c,$$

where [X, Y]_{t}^{c} denotes the optional quadratic covariation of the continuous parts of X and Y, which is the optional quadratic covariation minus the jumps of the processes $X$ and $Y$, i.e.

$$\left [ X, Y\right]_t^c:=
[X,Y]_t - \sum\limits_{s\leq t}\Delta X_s\Delta Y_s$$.

The alternative notation

$$\int_0^t X_s \, \partial Y_s$$

is also used to denote the Stratonovich integral.

== Applications ==
An important application of stochastic calculus is in mathematical finance, in which asset prices are often assumed to follow stochastic differential equations. For example, in the Black–Scholes–Merton model, the price of the underlying asset is modeled as a geometric Brownian motion, a particular Itô process.

== Stochastic integrals ==
Besides the classical Itô integral and Fisk–Stratonovich integral, many other notions of stochastic integrals exist, such as the Hitsuda–Skorokhod integral, the Marcus integral, and the Ogawa integral.

== See also ==
- Itô calculus
- Itô's lemma
- Stratonovich integral
- Semimartingale
- Wiener process
- Quantum stochastic calculus
