= Càdlàg =

Right continuous function with left limits

In mathematics, a càdlàg (French: continue à droite, limite à gauche), RCLL ("right continuous with left limits"), or corlol ("continuous on (the) right, limit on (the) left") function is a function defined on the real numbers (or a subset of them) that is everywhere right-continuous and has left limits everywhere. Càdlàg functions are important in the study of stochastic processes that admit (or even require) jumps, unlike Brownian motion, which has continuous sample paths. The collection of càdlàg functions on a given domain is known as Skorokhod space.

Two related terms are càglàd, standing for "continue à gauche, limite à droite", the left-right reversal of càdlàg, and càllàl for "continue à l'un, limite à l’autre" (continuous on one side, limit on the other side), for a function which at each point of the domain is either càdlàg or càglàd.

== Definition ==
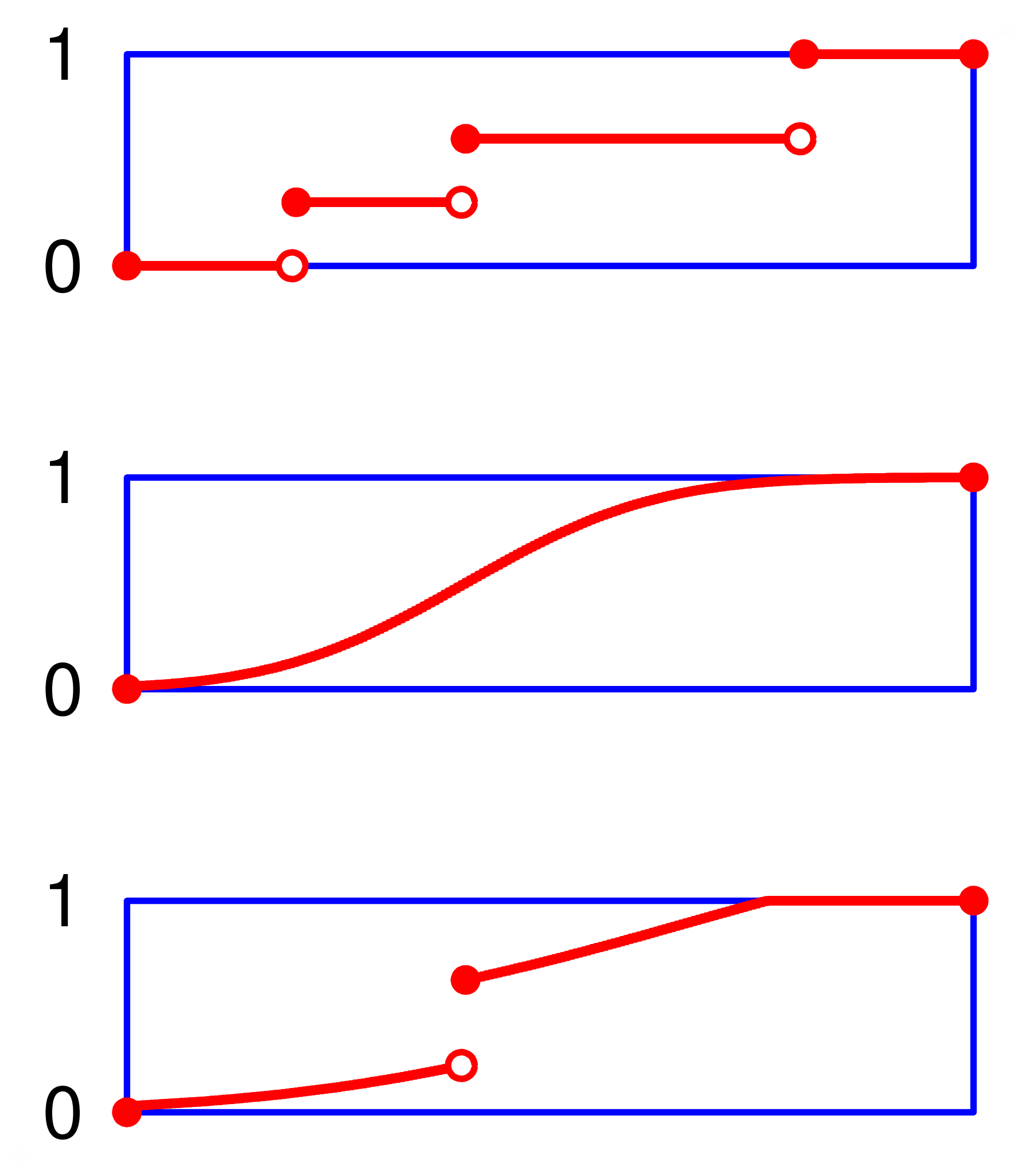
Cumulative distribution functions are examples of càdlàg functions.

Example of a cumulative distribution function with a countably infinite set of discontinuities

Let $(M, d)$ be a metric space, and let $E \subseteq \mathbb{R}$. A function $f:E \to M$ is called a càdlàg function if, for every $t \in E$,

- the left limit $f(t-) := \lim_{s \to t^{-}}f(s)$ exists; and
- the right limit $f(t+) := \lim_{s \to t^{+}}f(s)$ exists and equals $f(t)$.

That is, $f$ is right-continuous with left limits.

== Examples ==
- All functions continuous on a subset of the real numbers are càdlàg functions on that subset.
- As a consequence of their definition, all cumulative distribution functions are càdlàg functions. Conversely, every monotone càdlàg function on ℝ whose left limit = 0 and whose right limit = 1 is the cumulative distribution function of some probability distribution.
- The right derivative $f^\prime_+$ of any convex function $f$ defined on an open interval, is an increasing càdlàg function.

== Skorokhod space ==
The set of all càdlàg functions from $E$ to $M$ is often denoted by $\mathbb{D}(E:M)$ (or simply $\mathbb{D}$) and is called Skorokhod space after the Ukrainian mathematician Anatoliy Skorokhod. Skorokhod space can be assigned a topology that intuitively allows us to "wiggle space and time a bit" (whereas the traditional topology of uniform convergence only allows us to "wiggle space a bit"). For simplicity, take $E = [0, T]$ and $M = \mathbb{R}^n$ — see Billingsley for a more general construction.

We must first define an analogue of the modulus of continuity, $\varpi'_{f} (\delta)$. For any $F \subseteq E$, set

$$w_{f} (F) := \sup_{s, t \in F} | f(s) - f(t) |$$

and, for $\delta > 0$, define the càdlàg modulus to be

$$\varpi'_{f} (\delta) := \inf_{\Pi} \max_{1 \leq i \leq k} w_{f} ([t_{i - 1}, t_{i})),$$

where the infimum runs over all partitions $\Pi = \{0 = t_0 < t_1 < \dots < t_k = T\},\; k \in E$, with $\min_i(t_{i+1} - t_i) > \delta$. This definition makes sense for non-càdlàg $f$ (just as the usual modulus of continuity makes sense for discontinuous functions). $f$ is càdlàg if and only if $\lim_{\delta \to 0} \varpi'_{f} (\delta) = 0$.

Now let $\Lambda$ denote the set of all strictly increasing, continuous bijections from $E$ to itself (these are "wiggles in time"). Let

$$\| f \| := \sup_{t \in E} | f(t) |$$

denote the uniform norm on functions on $E$. Define the Skorokhod metric $\sigma$ on $\mathbb{D}$ by

$$\sigma (f, g) := \inf_{\lambda \in \Lambda} \max \{ \| \lambda - I \|, \| f - g \circ \lambda \| \},$$

where $I: E \to E$ is the identity function. In terms of the "wiggle" intuition, $\| \lambda - I \|$ measures the size of the "wiggle in time", and $\| f - g \circ \lambda \|$ measures the size of the "wiggle in space".

The Skorokhod metric is indeed a metric. The topology $\Sigma$ generated by $\sigma$ is called the Skorokhod topology on $\mathbb{D}$.

An equivalent metric,

$$d (f, g) := \inf_{\lambda \in \Lambda}  (\| \lambda - I \|+ \| f - g \circ \lambda \|),$$

was introduced independently and utilized in control theory for the analysis of switching systems.

== Properties of Skorokhod space ==
=== Generalization of the uniform topology ===
The space $C$ of continuous functions on $E$ is a subspace of $\mathbb{D}$. The Skorokhod topology relativized to $C$ coincides with the uniform topology there.

=== Completeness ===
Although $\mathbb{D}$ is not a complete space with respect to the Skorokhod metric $\sigma$, there is a topologically equivalent metric $\sigma_0$ with respect to which $\mathbb{D}$ is complete.

=== Separability ===
With respect to either $\sigma$ or $\sigma_0$, $\mathbb{D}$ is a separable space. Thus, Skorokhod space is a Polish space.

=== Tightness in Skorokhod space ===
By an application of the Arzelà–Ascoli theorem, one can show that a sequence $(\mu_n)_{n=1,2,\dots}$ of probability measures on Skorokhod space $\mathbb{D}$ is tight if and only if both the following conditions are met:

$$\lim_{a \to \infty} \limsup_{n \to \infty} \mu_{n}\big( \{ f \in \mathbb{D} \;|\; \| f \| \geq a \} \big) = 0,$$

and

$$\lim_{\delta \to 0} \limsup_{n \to \infty} \mu_{n}\big( \{ f \in \mathbb{D} \;|\; \varpi'_{f} (\delta) \geq \varepsilon \} \big) = 0\text{ for all }\varepsilon > 0.$$

=== Algebraic and topological structure ===
Under the Skorokhod topology and pointwise addition of functions, $\mathbb{D}$ is not a topological group, as can be seen by the following example:

Let $E=[0,2)$ be a half-open interval and take $f_n = \chi_{[1-1/n,2)} \in \mathbb{D}$ to be a sequence of characteristic functions. Despite the fact that $f_n \rightarrow \chi_{[1,2)}$ in the Skorokhod topology, the sequence $f_n - \chi_{[1,2)}$ does not converge to 0.

== See also ==
- Classical Wiener space – Space of stochastic processes
