= Adapted process =

Stochastic process

In the study of stochastic processes, a stochastic process is adapted (also referred to as a non-anticipating or non-anticipative process) if information about the value of the process at a given time is available at that same time. An informal interpretation is that X is adapted if and only if, for every realisation and every n, X_{n} is known at time n. The concept of an adapted process is essential, for instance, in the definition of the Itō integral, which only makes sense if the integrand is an adapted process.

== Definition ==
Let

- $(\Omega, \mathcal{F}, \mathbb{P})$ be a probability space;
- $I$ be an index set with a total order $\leq$ (often, $I$ is $\mathbb{N}$, $\mathbb{N}_0$, $[0, T]$ or $[0, +\infty)$);
- $\left(\mathcal{F}_i\right)_{i \in I}$ be a filtration of the sigma algebra $\mathcal{F}$;
- $(S,\Sigma)$ be a measurable space, the state space;
- $X_i: I \times \Omega \to S$ be a stochastic process.

The stochastic process $(X_i)_{i\in I}$ is said to be adapted to the filtration $\left(\mathcal{F}_i\right)_{i \in I}$ if the random variable $X_i: \Omega \to S$ is a $(\mathcal{F}_i, \Sigma)$-measurable function for each $i \in I$.

== Examples ==
Consider a stochastic process X : [0, T] × Ω → R, and equip the real line R with its usual Borel sigma algebra generated by the open sets.

- If we take the natural filtration F_{•}^{X}, where F_{t}^{X} is the σ-algebra generated by the pre-images X_{s}^{−1}(B) for Borel subsets B of R and times 0 ≤ s ≤ t, then X is automatically F_{•}^{X}-adapted. Intuitively, the natural filtration F_{•}^{X} contains "total information" about the behaviour of X up to time t.
- This offers a simple example of a non-adapted process X : [0, 2] × Ω → R: set F_{t} to be the trivial σ-algebra {∅, Ω} for times 0 ≤ t < 1, and F_{t} = F_{t}^{X} for times 1 ≤ t ≤ 2. Since the only way that a function can be measurable with respect to the trivial σ-algebra is to be constant, any process X that is non-constant on [0, 1] will fail to be F_{•}-adapted. The non-constant nature of such a process "uses information" from the more refined "future" σ-algebras F_{t}, 1 ≤ t ≤ 2.

== See also ==
- Predictable process
- Progressively measurable process
