= Stochastic quantum mechanics =

Interpretation of quantum mechanics

Stochastic quantum mechanics is a framework for describing the dynamics of particles that are subjected to intrinsic random processes as well as various external forces. The framework provides a derivation of the diffusion equations associated to these stochastic particles. It is best known for its derivation of the Schrödinger equation as the Kolmogorov equation for a certain type of conservative (or unitary) diffusion.

The derivation can be based on the extremization of an action in combination with a quantization prescription. This quantization prescription can be compared to canonical quantization and the path integral formulation, and is often referred to as Nelson's stochastic quantization or stochasticization. As the theory allows for a derivation of the Schrödinger equation, it has given rise to the stochastic interpretation of quantum mechanics. This interpretation has served as the main motivation for developing the theory of stochastic mechanics.

In the 1930s both Erwin Schrodinger and Reinhold Furth recognised a similarity between the equations of classical diffusion and the formalism of quantum theory, but the first relatively coherent stochastic theory of quantum mechanics was put forward in 1946 by Hungarian physicist Imre Fényes. Louis de Broglie felt compelled to incorporate a stochastic process underlying quantum mechanics to make particles switch from one pilot wave to another. The theory of stochastic quantum mechanics is ascribed to Edward Nelson, who independently discovered a derivation of the Schrödinger equation within this framework. This theory was also developed by Davidson, Guerra, Ruggiero, Pavon and others.

== Stochastic interpretation of quantum mechanics ==
The stochastic interpretation interprets the paths in the path integral formulation of quantum mechanics as the sample paths of a stochastic process. It posits that quantum particles are localized on one of these paths, but observers cannot predict with certainty where the particle is localized. The only way to locate the particle is by performing a measurement. An observer can only predict probabilities for the outcomes of such a measurement based on their earlier measurements and their knowledge about the forces that are acting on the particle.

This interpretation is well-known from the context of statistical mechanics, and Brownian motion in particular. Hence, according to the stochastic interpretation, quantum mechanics should be interpreted in a way similar to Brownian motion. However, in the case of Brownian motion, the existence of a probability measure (called the Wiener measure) that defines the statistical path integral is well established, and this measure can be generated by a stochastic process called the Wiener process. On the other hand, proving the existence of a probability measure that defines the quantum mechanical path integral faces difficulties, and it is not guaranteed that such a probability measure can be generated by a stochastic process. Stochastic mechanics is the framework concerned with the construction of such stochastic processes that generate a probability measure for quantum mechanics.

For a Brownian motion, it is known that the statistical fluctuations of a Brownian particle are often induced by the interaction of the particle with a large number of microscopic particles. In this case, the description of a Brownian motion in terms of the Wiener process is only used as an approximation, which neglects the dynamics of the individual particles in the background. Instead it describes the influence of these background particles by their statistical behavior.

The stochastic interpretation of quantum mechanics is agnostic about the origin of the quantum fluctuations of a quantum particle. It introduces the quantum fluctuations as the result of a new stochastic law of nature called the background hypothesis. This hypothesis can be interpreted as a strict implementation of the statement that `God plays dice', but it leaves open the possibility that this dice game is replaced by a hidden variable theory, as in the theory of Brownian motion.

The remainder of this article deals with the definition of such a process and the derivation of the diffusion equations associated to this process. This is done in a general setting with Brownian motion and Quantum mechanics as special limits, where one obtains respectively the heat equation and the Schrödinger equation. The derivation heavily relies on tools from Lagrangian mechanics and stochastic calculus.

== Stochastic quantization ==
The postulates of the theory can be summarized in a stochastic quantization condition that was formulated by Nelson. For a non-relativistic theory on $\mathbb{R}^n$ this condition states:

- the trajectory of a quantum particle is described by the real projection of a complex semi-martingale: $X(t) = {\rm Re}[Z(t)]$ with $Z(t) = C(t) + M(t)$, where $C(t)$ is a continuous finite variation process and $M(t)$ is a complex martingale,
- the trajectory stochastically extremizes an action $S = \mathbb{E}\left[\int L \, dt\right]$,
- the martingale $M(t)$ is a continuous process with independent increments and finite moments. Furthermore, its quadratic variation is fixed by the structure relation $d[M^i,M^j] = \frac{\alpha \, \hbar}{m} \, \delta^{ij} \, dt$ where $m$ is the mass of the particle, $\hbar$ the reduced Planck constant, $\alpha = |\alpha| e^{{\rm i} \phi} \in \mathbb{C}$ is a dimensionless constant, and $\delta^{ij}$ is the Kronecker delta,
- the time reversed process exists and is subjected to the same dynamical laws.

Using the decomposition $Z= X + {\rm i} \, Y$, and the fact that $C$ has finite variation, one finds that the quadratic variation of $X$ and $Y$ is given by

$$\begin{pmatrix}
d[X^i,X^j] & d[X^i,Y^j]\\
d[Y^i,X^j] & d[Y^i,Y^j]
\end{pmatrix}
=
\frac{|\alpha| \, \hbar}{2\,m} \, \delta^{ij} \,
\begin{pmatrix}
1 + \cos\phi & \sin \phi \\
\sin \phi & 1 - \cos\phi
\end{pmatrix}
\, dt$$

Hence, by Lévy's characterization of Brownian motion, $X(t)$ and $Y(t)$ describe two correlated Wiener processes with a drift described by the finite variation process $C(t)$, a diffusion constant scaling with $|\alpha|\in[0,\infty)$, and a correlation depending on the angle $\phi$. The processes are maximally correlated in the quantum limit, associated to $\phi \in \left\{- \frac{\pi}{2}, \frac{\pi}{2}\right\}$ and corresponding to $\alpha \in {\rm i} \times \R$, whereas they are uncorrelated in the Brownian limit, associated to $\phi \in \{ 0, \pi \}$ and corresponding to $\alpha \in \R$,

The term stochastic quantization to describe this quantization procedure was introduced in the 1970s. Nowadays, stochastic quantization more commonly refers to a framework developed by Parisi and Wu in 1981. Consequently, the quantization procedure developed in stochastic mechanics is sometimes also referred to as Nelson's stochastic quantization or stochasticization.

== Velocity of the process ==
The stochastic process $Z(t)$ is almost surely nowhere differentiable, such that the velocity $\dot{Z}(t) = \frac{dZ(t)}{dt}$ along the process is not well-defined. However, there exist velocity fields, defined using conditional expectations. These are given by

$$w_+(x,t) = \lim_{dt\rightarrow0} \mathbb{E}\left[\frac{ Z(t+dt) - Z(t) }{dt} \, \Big| \, X(t) = x \right],$$
$w_-(x,t) = \lim_{dt \rightarrow 0} \mathbb{E}\left[\frac{ Z(t) - Z(t-dt) }{dt} \, \Big| \, X(t) = x \right],$and can be associated to the Itô integral along the process $Z(t)$. Since the process is not differentiable, these velocities are, in general, not equal to each other. The physical interpretation of this fact is as follows: at any time $t$ the particle is subjected to a random force that instantaneously changes its velocity from $w_-$ to $w_+$. As the two velocity fields are not equal, there is no unique notion of velocity for the process $Z(t)$. In fact, any velocity given by
$$w_a = a \ w_+ + (1-a) \ w_-$$

with $a\in [0,1]$ represents a valid choice for the velocity of the process $Z(t)$. This is particularly true for the special case $a =\frac{1}{2}$ denoted by $w_\circ = \frac{w_+ + w_-}{2}$ , which can be associated to the Stratonovich integral along $Z(t)$.

Since $Z(t)$ has a non-vanishing quadratic variation, one can additionally define second order velocity fields given by

$$w_{2,+} (x,t) = \lim_{dt \rightarrow 0} \mathbb{E} \left[ \frac{[Z(t+dt)-Z(t)] \otimes [Z(t+dt)-Z(t)] }{dt} \ \Big| \ X(t) = x \right] ,$$
$$w_{2,-} (x,t) = \lim_{dt \rightarrow 0} \mathbb{E} \left[ \frac{[Z(t)-Z(t-dt)] \otimes [Z(t)-Z(t-dt)] }{dt} \ \Big| \ X(t) = x \right] .$$

The time-reversibility postulate imposes a relation on these two fields such that $w_{2,\pm} = \pm \, w_2$. Moreover, using the structure relation by which the quadratic variation is fixed, one finds that $w_2^{ij}(x,t) = \frac{\alpha \, \hbar}{m} \, \delta^{ij}$. It follows that in the Stratonovich formulation the second order part of the velocity vanishes, i.e. $w_{2,\circ} = 0$.

The real and imaginary part of the velocities are detnoted by

$$v = {\rm Re}(w) \qquad {\rm and} \qquad u = {\rm Im}(w) \, .$$

Using the existence of these velocity fields, one can formally define the velocity processes $W_\pm(t)$ by the Itô integral $\int W_\pm(t) \ dt = \int d_\pm Z(t)$. Similarly, one can formally define a process $W_\circ(t)$ by the Stratonovich integral$\int W_\circ(t) \ dt = \int d_\circ Z(t)$ and a second order velocity process $W_2(t)$ by the Stieltjes integral $\int W_2(t) \ dt = \int d[Z,Z](t)$. Using the structure relation, one then finds that the second order velocity process is given by $W_2^{ij}(t) = \frac{\alpha \ \hbar}{m} \ \delta^{ij}$. However, the processes $W_\pm(t)$ and $W_\circ(t)$ are not well-defined: the first moments exist and are given by $\mathbb{E}[W_\pm(t) \ | \ X(t)] = w_\pm(X(t),t)$, but the quadratic moments diverge, i.e. $\mathbb{E}[||W_\pm(t)||^2 \ | \ X(t)] = \infty$. The physical interpretation of this divergence is that in the position representation the position is known precisely, but the velocity has an infinite uncertainty.

== Stochastic action ==
The stochastic quantization condition states that the stochastic trajectory must extremize a stochastic action $S = \mathbb{E}\left[\int L \, dt\right]$, but does not specify the stochastic Lagrangian $L$. This Lagrangian can be obtained from a classical Lagrangian using a standard procedure. Here, we consider a classical Lagrangian of the form

$$L(x,v,t) = \frac{m}{2} \delta_{ij} v^i v^j + q \, A_i(x,t) \, v^i - \mathfrak{U}(x,t) .$$

Here, $(x,v)$ are coordinates in phase space (the tangent bundle), $\delta_{ij}$ is the Kronecker delta describing the metric on $\mathbb{R}^n$, $m$ denotes the mass of the particle, $q$ the charge under the vector potential $A$, and $\mathfrak{U}$ is a scalar potential. Moreover, the Einstein summation convention is assumed.

An important property of this Lagrangian is the principle of gauge invariance. This can be made explicit by defining a new action $\tilde{S}$ through the addition of a total derivative term to the original action, such that

$$\tilde{S}[x(t)] = S[x(t)] + \int dF(x,t)
= \int\left[ \frac{m}{2} \delta_{ij} v^i v^j + q A_i v^i - \mathfrak{U} + \partial_t F+ v^i \partial_i F  \right] dt
= \int\left[ \frac{m}{2} \delta_{ij} v^i v^j + q \tilde{A}_i v^i - \tilde{\mathfrak{U}} \right] dt,$$

where $\tilde{A}_i = A_i + q^{-1} \partial_i F$ and $\tilde{\mathfrak{U}} = \mathfrak{U} - \partial_t F$. Thus, since the dynamics should not be affected by the addition of a total derivative to the action, the action is gauge invariant under the above redefinition of the potentials for an arbitrary differentiable function $F$.

In order to construct a stochastic Lagrangian corresponding to this classical Lagrangian, one must look for a minimal extension of the above Lagrangian that respects this gauge invariance. In the Stratonovich formulation of the theory, this can be done straightforwardly, since the differential operator in the Stratonovich formulation is given by

$$\int d_\circ F(x,t) = \int \left( \partial_t F + v_\circ^i \partial_i F \right) dt \, .$$

Therefore, the Stratonovich Lagrangian can be obtained by replacing the classical velocity $v$ by the complex velocity $w_\circ$, such that

$$L_\circ(x,w_\circ,t) = \frac{m}{2} \delta_{ij} w_\circ^i w_\circ^j + q A_i w_\circ^i - \mathfrak{U} \, .$$

In the Itô formulation, things are more complicated, as the total derivative is given by Itô's lemma: $\int d_\pm F(x,t) = \int \left( \partial_t F + v_\pm^i \partial_i F \pm \frac{1}{2} v_2^{ij} \partial_j \partial_i F \right) dt \, .$

Due to the presence of the second order derivative term, the gauge invariance is broken. However, this can be restored by adding a derivative of the vector potential to the Lagrangian. Hence, the stochastic Lagrangian is given by a Lagrangian of the form

$$L_\pm(x,w_\pm,w_2,t) = \frac{m}{2} \delta_{ij} w_\pm^i w_\pm^j
+ q \, A_i w_\pm^i \pm \frac{q}{2} \partial_j A_i  w_2^{ij}
- \mathfrak{U} \, .$$

The stochastic action can be defined using the Stratonovich Lagrangian, which is equal to the action defined by the Itô Lagrangian up to a divergent term:

$$S = \mathbb{E}\left[\int L_\circ \, dt\right] = \mathbb{E}\left[\int L_\pm dt\right] \pm \mathbb{E}\left[\int L_\infty  dt\right] \, .$$

The divergent term can be calculated and is given by

$$\mathbb{E}\left[ \int L_\infty  dt \right]
= \frac{m}{2} \oint_\gamma \frac{ \delta_{ij} w_2^{ij} }{t} dt
= \alpha \, \hbar \, \pi \, {\rm i} \, \sum_{i=1}^n k_i,$$

where $k_i \in \mathbb{Z}$ are winding numbers that count the winding of the path $\gamma(t)$ around the pole at $t=0$.

As the divergent term is constant, it does not contribute to the equations of motion. For this reason, this term has been discarded in early works on stochastic mechanics. However, when this term is discarded, stochastic mechanics cannot account for the appearance of discrete spectra in quantum mechanics. This issue is known as Wallstrom's criticism, and can be resolved by properly taking into account the divergent term.

There also exists a Hamiltonian formulation of stochastic mechanics. It starts from the definition of canonical momenta:

$$p_{\circ,i}
= \frac{\partial L_{\circ}}{\partial w_{\circ}^{i}}
= m \, \delta_{ij} w_{\circ}^{j} + q \, A_i \, ,$$
$$p_{\pm,i}
= \frac{\partial L_{\pm}}{\partial w_{\pm}^{i}}
= m \, \delta_{ij} w_{\pm}^{j} + q \, A_i \, .$$

The Hamiltonian in the Stratonovich formulation can then be obtained by the first order Legendre transform:

$$H_{\circ}(x,p_{\circ},t) = p_{\circ,i} v_{\circ}^{i} - L(x,v_{\circ},t) \, .$$

In the Itô formulation, on the other hand, the Hamiltonian is obtained through a second order Legendre transform:

$$H_{\pm}(x,p^{\pm},\partial p^{\pm}, t)
= p^{\pm}_i w_{\pm}^{i} \pm  \frac{1}{2} w_2^{ij} \partial p^\pm_{ij} - L(x,w_{\pm},w_2,t) \, .$$

== Euler–Lagrange equations ==
The stochastic action can be extremized, which leads to a stochastic version of the Euler–Lagrange equations. In the Stratonovich formulation, these are given by

$$\int d_\circ \left( \frac{\partial L_\circ}{\partial w_\circ^i} \right) = \int \left( \frac{\partial L_\circ}{\partial x^i}\right)  dt \, .$$

For the Lagrangian, discussed in previous section, this leads to the following second order stochastic differential equation in the sense of Stratonovich:

$$m \, \delta_{ij} \, d_\circ^2 Z^j(t)
= q \, F_{ij}(X(t),t) \, d_\circ Z^j(t) \, dt
- q \, \partial_t A_i(X(t),t) \, dt^2
- \partial_i \mathfrak{U}(X(t),t) \, dt^2 \, ,$$

where, the field strength is given by $F_{ij} : = \partial_i A_j - \partial_j A_i$. This equation serves as a stochastic version of Newton's second law.

In the Itô formulation, the stochastic Euler–Lagrange equations are given by

$$\int d_\pm \left( \frac{\partial L_\pm}{\partial w_\pm^i} \right) = \int \left(\frac{\partial L_\pm }{\partial x^i}\right)  dt \, .$$

This leads to a second order stochastic differential equation in the sense of Itô, given by a stochastic version of Newton's second law in the form

$$m \, \delta_{ij} \, d_\pm^2 Z^j(t)
= q \, F_{ij}(X(t),t) \, d_\pm Z^j(t) \, dt
\pm \frac{\alpha \, \hbar \, q}{2 \, m} \, \delta^{jk}\, \partial_k F_{ij}(X(t),t) \, dt^2
- q \, \partial_t A_i(X(t),t) \, dt^2
- \partial_i \mathfrak{U}(X(t),t) \, dt^2 \, .$$

== Hamilton-Jacobi equations ==
The equations of motion can also be obtained in a stochastic generalization of the Hamilton-Jacobi formulation of classical mechanics. In this case, one starts by defining Hamilton's principal function. For the Lagrangian $L_+$, this function is defined as

$$S_+(x,t;x_f,t_f) := - \mathbb{E}\left[
\int_t^{t_f} L_+(X(s),W_+(s),W_2(s),s) \, ds \, \Big| \, X(t) = x, X(t_f) = x_f
\right] ,$$

where it is assumed that the process $\{ X(s) : s \in [t, t_f ] \}$ obeys the stochastic Euler–Lagrange equations. Similarly, for the Lagrangian $L_-$, Hamilton's principal function is defined as

$$S_-(x,t;x_0,t_0) := \mathbb{E} \left[
\int_{t_0}^{t} L_-(X(s), W_-(s), W_2(s), s) \, ds \, \Big| \, X(t) = x, X(t_0) = x_0
\right] ,$$

where it is assumed that the process $\{ X(s) : s \in [t_0 , t ] \}$ obeys the stochastic Euler–Lagrange equations. Due to the divergent part of the action, these principal functions are subjected to the equivalence relation

$$\tilde{S}_\pm \equiv S_\pm
\; {\rm if} \; \exists k \in \mathbb{Z}^n, \; {\rm such \, that} \;
\tilde{S}_\pm = S_\pm \pm  \alpha \, \pi \, {\rm i} \, \hbar \, \sum_{i=1}^n k_i \, .$$

By varying the principal functions with respect to the point $(x,t)$ one finds the Hamilton-Jacobi equations. These are given by

$$\begin{cases}
\frac{\partial }{\partial x^i} S_\pm(x,t) &= p_i^{\pm}(x,t) \, ,\\
\frac{\partial}{\partial t} S_\pm(x,t) &= - H_\pm(x,p_\pm(x,t), \partial p_\pm(x,t),t) \, .
\end{cases}$$

Note that these look the same as in the classical case. However, the Hamiltonian, in the second Hamilton-Jacobi equation is now obtained using a second order Legendre transform. Moreover, due to the divergent part of the action, there is a third Hamilton-Jacobi equation, which takes the form of the non-trivial integral constraint

$$\oint \left(p_i^\pm \,  v_\pm^i \pm \frac{1}{2} v_2^{ij} \, \partial_i p_j \right) dt
= \pm \alpha \, \hbar \, \pi \, {\rm i} \, \sum_{i=1}^n k_i \, .$$

For the given Lagrangian the first two Hamilton-Jacobi equations yield

$$\begin{cases}
\partial_i S &= m \, \delta_{ij} w_{\pm}^j + q \, A_i \, ,\\
\partial_t S &= - \frac{m}{2} \, \delta_{ij} w_{\pm}^i w_{\pm}^j
\mp \frac{m}{2} \, \delta_{ij} w_2^{ik} \partial_k w_{\pm}^j
- \mathfrak{U} \, .
\end{cases}$$

These two equations can be combined, yielding

$$\left[ m \, \delta_{ij} \left(
\partial_t + w_\pm^k \partial_k
\pm \frac{1}{2} \, w_2^{kl} \partial_l \partial_k
\right)
- q \, F_{ij}
\right] w_\pm^j
=
\pm \frac{q}{2} \, w_2^{jk} \partial_k F_{ij}
- q \, \partial_t A_i - \partial_i \mathfrak{U} \, .$$

Using that $w_2^{ij} = \frac{\alpha \, \hbar}{m} \, \delta^{ij}$, this equation, subjected to the integral condition and the initial condition $w_+ (x, t_0) = w_0 (x)$ or terminal condition $w_-(x,t_f) = w_f(x)$, can be solved for $w_\pm(x,t)$. The solution can then be plugged into the Itô equation

$$\begin{cases}
d_\pm Z^i(t) &= w_\pm^i(x,t) \, dt + dM^i(t) \, ,\\
d[M^i,M^j](t) &= \frac{\alpha\, \hbar}{m} \delta^{ij} \, dt \, ,
\end{cases}$$

which can be solved for the process $\{Z(t) : t\in[t_0,t_f]\}$. Thus, when an initial condition $X(t_0)=x_0$ (for the future directed equation labeled with $+$) or terminal condition $X(t_f)=x_f$ (for the past directed equation labeled with $-$) is specified, one finds a unique stochastic process $\{ X(t) : t \in [t_0,t_f] \}$ that describes the trajectory of the particle.

== Diffusion equation ==
The key result of Nelsonian stochastic mechanics is that it derives the Schrödinger equation from the postulated stochastic process. In this derivation, the Hamilton-Jacobi equations

$$\begin{cases}
\frac{\partial }{\partial x^i} S_\pm(x,t) &= p_i^{\pm}(x,t)\\
\frac{\partial}{\partial t} S_\pm(x,t) &= - H_\pm(x,p_\pm(x,t), \partial p_\pm(x,t),t)
\end{cases}$$

are combined, such that one obtains the equation

$$2 \, m \left( \partial_t S_\pm + \mathfrak{U}  \right)
+ \delta^{ij} \left(
\partial_i S_\pm \partial_j S_\pm
\pm \alpha \, \hbar \, \partial_j \partial_i S_\pm
- 2 \, q \, A_i \partial_j S_\pm
\mp \alpha \, \hbar \, q \, \partial_j A_i
+ q^2 \, A_i A_j
\right)
= 0 \, .$$

Subsequently, one defines the wave function

$$\Psi_\pm(x,t) = \exp\left( \pm \frac{S_\pm(x,t)}{\alpha \, \hbar} \right) .$$

Since Hamilton's principal functions are multivalued, one finds that the wave functions are subjected to the equivalence relations

$$\tilde{\Psi}_+ \equiv \Psi_+ \quad {\rm if} \quad \tilde{\Psi}_+ = \pm \Psi_+
\qquad {\rm and} \qquad
\tilde{\Psi}_- \equiv \Psi_- \quad {\rm if} \quad  \tilde{\Psi}_- = \pm \Psi_- \, .$$

Furthermore, the wave functions are subjected to the complex diffusion equations

$$- \alpha \, \hbar \, \frac{\partial}{\partial t} \Psi_+
= \left[
\frac{\delta^{ij}}{2 \, m}
\left(\alpha \, \hbar \, \frac{\partial}{\partial x^i} + q \, A_i \right)
\left(\alpha \, \hbar \, \frac{\partial}{\partial x^j} + q \, A_j \right)
+ \mathfrak{U}
\right] \Psi_+ \, ,$$
$$\alpha \, \hbar \, \frac{\partial}{\partial t} \Psi_-
= \left[
\frac{\delta^{ij}}{2 \, m}
\left(\alpha \, \hbar \, \frac{\partial}{\partial x^i} + q \, A_i \right)
\left(\alpha \, \hbar \, \frac{\partial}{\partial x^j} + q \, A_j \right)
+ \mathfrak{U}
\right] \Psi_- \, .$$

Thus, for any for any process that solves the postulates of stochastic mechanics, one can construct a wave function that obeys these diffusion equations. Due to the equivalence relations on Hamilton's principal function, the opposite statement is also true: for any solution of these complex diffusion equations, one can construct a stochastic process $\{ X(t) : t \in [t_0,t_f] \}$ that is a solution of the postulates of stochastic mechanics. A similar result has been established by the Feynman-Kac theorem.

Finally, one can construct a probability density

$$\rho_\pm (x,t) := \frac{| \Psi_\pm(x,t) |^2 }{\int | \Psi_\pm(y,t) |^2 d^n y} \, ,$$

which describes transition probabilities for the process $\{ X(t) : t \in [t_0,t_f] \}$. More precisely, $\rho_+$ describes the probability of being in the state $(x,t)$ given that the system ends up in the state $(x_f,t_f)$. Therefore, the diffusion equation for $\Psi_+$ can be interpreted as the Kolmogorov backward equation of the process $\{ X(t) : t \in [t_0,t_f] \}$. Similarly, $\rho_-$ describes the probability of being in the state $(x,t)$ given that the system ends up in the state $(x_0,t_0)$, when it is evolved backward in time. Therefore, the diffusion equation for $\Psi_-$ can be interpreted as the Kolmogorov backward equation of the process $\{ X(t) : t \in [t_0,t_f] \}$ when it is evolved towards the past. By inverting the time direction, one finds that $\rho_-$ describes the probability of being in the state $(x,t)$ given that the system starts in the state $(x_0,t_0)$, when it is evolved forward in time. Thus, the diffusion equation for $\Psi_-$ can also be interpreted as the Kolmogorov Forward equation of the process $\{ X(t) : t \in [t_0,t_f] \}$ when it is evolved towards the future.

== Mathematical aspects ==
=== Limiting cases ===
The theory contains various special limits:

- The classical limit with $\alpha = 0$. In this case, the process $X$ and auxiliary process $Y$ describes two decoupled deterministic trajectories.
- The Brownian limit with $\alpha \in (0,\infty)$. In this case, the process $X$ describes a Wiener process (a.k.a. Brownian Motion) for which the above result is established by the Feynman-Kac theorem, whereas the auxiliary process $Y$ describes a deterministic process.
- The quantum limit with $\alpha \in {\rm i} \times (0,\infty)$. In this case, the process $X$ and auxiliary process $Y$ describe two positively correlated Wiener processes.
- The time-reversed Brownian limit with $\alpha \in (-\infty,0)$. In this case, the process $X$ describes a deterministic process, whereas the auxiliary process $Y$ describes a Wiener process.
- The time-reversed quantum limit with $\alpha \in {\rm i} \times (-\infty,0)$. In this case, the process $X$ and auxiliary process $Y$ describe two negatively correlated Wiener processes.

In the Brownian limit with initial condition $u(x, t_0) = 0$ or terminal condition $u(x, t_f) = 0$ (which implies $u(x, t) = 0 \quad \forall t$), the processes $X$ and $Y$ are decoupled, such that the dynamics of the auxiliary process $Y$ can be discarded, and $X$ is described by a real Wiener process. In all other cases with $\alpha \neq 0$, the processes are coupled to each other, such that the auxiliary process $Y$ must be taken into account in deriving the dynamics of $X$.

=== Time-reversal symmetry ===
The theory is symmetric under the time reversal operation $(t,\alpha,q) \leftrightarrow (-t,-\alpha,-q)$.

In the Brownian limits, the theory is maximally dissipative, whereas the quantum limits are unitary, such that

$$\frac{d}{dt} \int | \Psi_\pm(y,t) |^2 d^n y \Big|_{\alpha \in {\rm i} \times \R} = 0 \, .$$

=== Canonical commutation relations ===
The diffusion equation can be rewritten as

$$\mp \alpha \, \hbar \, \frac{\partial}{\partial t} \Psi_{\pm}
=
\hat{H} (\hat{x},\hat{p}^\pm,t) \, \Psi_\pm \, ,$$

where $\hat{H}$ is a Hamiltonian operator. This allows to introduce position and momentum operators as

$$\hat{x}^i = x^i \qquad {\rm and} \qquad
\hat{p}_i^\pm = \pm \alpha \, \hbar \, \frac{\partial}{\partial x^i} \, ,$$

such that the Hamiltonian has its familiar shape

$$H(\hat{x},\hat{p},t)
=
\frac{\delta^{ij}}{ 2 \, m} \,
\Big[ \hat{p}_i - q \, A_i ( \hat{x} , t ) \Big] \Big[ \hat{p}_j - q \, A_j (\hat{x},t) \Big]
+ \mathfrak{U}(\hat{x},t) \, .$$

These operators obey the canonical commutation relation

$$[ \hat{x}^i , \hat{p}^\pm_j ] = \mp \alpha \, \hbar \, \delta^i_j \, .$$

== See also ==
- Bell's theorem
- De Broglie–Bohm theory
- Madelung equations
- EPR paradox
- Hidden variable theory
- Interpretations of quantum mechanics
- Stochastic quantization
- Stochastic electrodynamics
