= Kolmogorov forward equations =

Kolmogorov forward equations may refer to:

- Kolmogorov equations (Markov jump process), relating to discrete processes
- Fokker–Planck equation, relating to diffusion processes
