= Kramers =

Kramers can refer to:

- Kramers (bookstore), Independent bookstore in Dupont Circle, Washington, D.C., United States
- Kramers (crater), an old lunar impact crater on the northern hemisphere on the far side of the Moon
- Kramers F.C., football team from Palau

People

- Johannes Hendrik Kramers (26 February 1891 – 17 December 1951), Dutch scholar of Islam
- Hans Kramers (2 February 1894 – 24 April 1952), Dutch physicist

== See also ==
- Kramers' law, physics, spectral distribution of X-rays
