= Imre Fényes =

Hungarian physicist (1917–1977)

- Born: 29 July 1917; Kötegyán
- Died: 13 November 1977 (aged 60); Budapest
- Citizenship: Hungarian
- Education: University of Kolozsvár
- Known for: Stochastic quantum mechanics
- Scientific career
- Fields: Physics
- Workplaces: University of Debrecen; Loránd Eötvös University

Imre Fényes (Hungarian: [ˈimrɛ ˈfeːɲɛʃ]; 29 July 1917 – 13 November 1977) was a Hungarian physicist who was the first to propose a stochastic interpretation of quantum mechanics.

== Selected publications ==
- Fényes, I. (1946). "A Deduction of Schrödinger Equation". Acta Bolyaiana. 1 (5): ch. 2.
- Fényess, I. (1948). "Zur wellenmechanischen Herleitung des statistischen Atommodells". Zeitschrift für Physik. 125 (4–6): 336–346. Bibcode:1948ZPhy..125..336F. doi:10.1007/BF01454902. ISSN 1434-6001. S2CID 119662528.
- Fényes, I. (1952). "Stochastischer Abhängigkeitscharakter der Heisenbergschen Ungenauigkeitsrelation". Die Naturwissenschaften. 39 (24): 568. Bibcode:1952NW.....39..568F. doi:10.1007/BF00590297. ISSN 0028-1042. S2CID 12868908.
- Fényes, I. (1952). "Eine wahrscheinlichkeitstheoretische Begründung und Interpretation der Quantenmechanik". Zeitschrift für Physik. 132 (1): 81–106. Bibcode:1952ZPhy..132...81F. doi:10.1007/BF01338578. ISSN 1434-6001. S2CID 119581427.
