= Kolmogorov backward equations (diffusion) =

Partial differential equations describing diffusion

The Kolmogorov backward equation (KBE) and its adjoint, the Kolmogorov forward equation, are partial differential equations (PDE) that arise in the theory of continuous-time continuous-state Markov processes. Both were published by Andrey Kolmogorov in 1931. Later it was realized that the forward equation was already known to physicists under the name Fokker–Planck equation; the KBE on the other hand was new.

== Overview ==
The Kolmogorov forward equation is used to evolve the state of a system forward in time. Given an initial probability distribution $p_t(x)$ for a system being in state $x$ at time $t,$ the forward PDE is integrated to obtain $p_s(x)$ at later times $s>t.$ A common case takes the initial value $p_t(x)$ to be a Dirac delta function centered on the known initial state $x.$

The Kolmogorov backward equation is used to estimate the probability of the current system evolving so that its future state at time $s>t$ is given by some fixed probability function $p_s(x).$ That is, the probability distribution in the future is given as a boundary condition, and the backwards PDE is integrated backwards in time.

A common boundary condition is to ask that the future state is contained in some subset of states $B,$ the target set. Writing the set membership function as $1_B,$ so that $1_B(x)=1$ if $x\in B$ and zero otherwise, the backward equation expresses the hit probability $p_t(x)$ that in the future, the set membership will be sharp, given by $p_s(x) = 1_B(x)/\Vert B\Vert.$ Here, $\Vert B\Vert$ is just the size of the set $B,$ a normalization so that the total probability at time $s$ integrates to one.

== Kolmogorov backward equation ==
Let $\{X_{t}\}_{0 \le t \le T}$ be the solution of the stochastic differential equation

$$dX_t \;=\; \mu\bigl(t, X_t\bigr)\,dt \;+\; \sigma\bigl(t, X_t\bigr)\,dW_t,
\quad 0 \;\le\; t \;\le\; T,$$

where $W_t$ is a (possibly multi-dimensional) Wiener process (Brownian motion), $\mu$ is the drift coefficient, and $\sigma$ is related to the diffusion coefficient $D$ as $D=\sigma^2/2.$ Define the transition density (or fundamental solution) $p(t,x;\,T,y)$ by

$$p(t,x;\,T,y)
\;=\;
\frac{\mathbb{P}[\,X_T \in dy \,\mid\, X_t = x\,]}{dy},
\quad
t < T.$$

Then the usual Kolmogorov backward equation for $p$ is

$$\frac{\partial p}{\partial t}(t, x;\,T, y)
\;+\;
A\, p(t, x;\,T, y)
\;=\;
0,
\quad
\lim_{t \to T}\, p(t,x;\,T,y)
\;=\;
\delta_{y}(x),$$

where $\delta_{y}(x)$ is the Dirac delta in $x$ centered at $y$, and $A$ is the infinitesimal generator of the diffusion:

$$A\,f(x)
\;=\;
\sum_{i}\,\mu_{i}(x)\,\frac{\partial f}{\partial x_{i}}(x)
\;+\;
\frac12\,\sum_{i,j}\,
\bigl[\sigma(x)\,\sigma(x)^{\mathsf{T}}\bigr]_{ij}\,
\frac{\partial^2 f}{\partial x_{i}\,\partial x_{j}}(x).$$

== Feynman–Kac formula ==
The backward Kolmogorov equation can be used to derive the Feynman–Kac formula. Given a function $F$ that satisfies the boundary value problem

$$\frac{\partial F}{\partial t}(t,x)
\;+\;
\mu(t,x)\,\frac{\partial F}{\partial x}(t,x)
\;+\;
\frac{1}{2}\,\sigma^2(t,x)\,\frac{\partial^2 F}{\partial x^2}(t,x)
\;=\;
0,
\quad
0 \le t \le T,
\quad
F(T,x) \;=\; \Phi(x)$$

and given $\{X_t\}_{0 \le t \le T},$ that, just as before, is a solution of

$$dX_t \;=\; \mu(t, X_t)\,dt \;+\; \sigma(t, X_t)\,dW_t,
\quad
0 \le t \le T,$$

then if the expectation value is finite

$$\int_{0}^{T}\,
\mathbb{E}\!\Bigl[
\bigl(\sigma(t, X_t)\,\frac{\partial F}{\partial x}(t, X_t)\bigr)^2
\Bigr]\,
dt
\;<\;\infty,$$

then the Feynman–Kac formula is obtained:

$$F(t,x)
\;=\;
\mathbb{E}\!\bigl[\;\Phi(X_T)\,\big|\;X_t = x\bigr].$$

Proof. Apply Itô's formula to $F(s, X_s)$ for $t \le s \le T$:

$$F(T, X_T)
\;=\;
F(t, X_t)
\;+\;
\int_{t}^{T}\!\Bigl\{
\frac{\partial F}{\partial s}(s, X_s)
\;+\;
\mu(s, X_s)\,\frac{\partial F}{\partial x}(s, X_s)
\;+\;
\tfrac12\,\sigma^2(s, X_s)\,\frac{\partial^2 F}{\partial x^2}(s, X_s)
\Bigr\}\,ds
\;+\;
\int_{t}^{T}\!\sigma(s, X_s)\,\frac{\partial F}{\partial x}(s, X_s)\,dW_s.$$

Because $F$ solves the PDE, the first integral is zero. Taking conditional expectation and using the martingale property of the Itô integral gives

$$\mathbb{E}\!\bigl[F(T, X_T)\,\big|\;X_t=x\bigr]
\;=\;
F(t, x).$$

Substitute $F(T, X_T) = \Phi(X_T)$ to conclude

$$F(t,x)
\;=\;
\mathbb{E}\!\bigl[\;\Phi(X_T)\,\big|\;X_t = x\bigr].$$

== Derivation of the backward Kolmogorov equation ==
The Feynman–Kac representation can be used to find the PDE solved by the transition densities of solutions to SDEs. Suppose

$$dX_t \;=\;
\mu(t, X_t)\,dt
\;+\;
\sigma(t, X_t)\,dW_t.$$

For any set $B$, define

$$p_B(t, x;\,T)
\;\triangleq\;
\mathbb{P}\!\bigl[X_T \in B \,\mid\, X_t = x\bigr]
\;=\;
\mathbb{E}\!\bigl[\mathbf{1}_B(X_T)\,\big|\;X_t = x\bigr].$$

By Feynman–Kac (under integrability conditions), taking $\Phi=\mathbf{1}_B$, then

$$\frac{\partial p_B}{\partial t}(t, x;\,T)
\;+\;
A\,p_B(t, x;\,T)
\;=\;0,
\quad
p_B(T, x;\,T)
\;=\;\mathbf{1}_B(x),$$

where

$$A\,f(t, x)
\;=\;
\mu(t, x)\,\frac{\partial f}{\partial x}(t, x)
\;+\;
\tfrac12\,\sigma^2(t, x)\,\frac{\partial^2 f}{\partial x^2}(t, x).$$

Assuming Lebesgue measure as the reference, write $|B|$ for its measure. The transition density $p(t, x;\,T, y)$ is

$$p(t, x;\,T, y)
\;\triangleq\;
\lim_{B \to y}\,\frac{1}{|B|}\,\mathbb{P}\!\bigl[X_T \in B\,\mid\,X_t = x\bigr].$$

Then

$$\frac{\partial p}{\partial t}(t, x;\,T, y)
\;+\;
A\,p(t, x;\,T, y)
\;=\;0,
\quad
p(t, x;\,T, y)
\;\to\;
\delta_y(x)
\quad
\text{as } t\;\to\;T.$$

== Derivation of the forward Kolmogorov equation ==
The Kolmogorov forward equation is

$$\frac{\partial}{\partial T}\,p\bigl(t, x;\,T, y\bigr)
\;=\;
A^{*}\!\bigl[p\bigl(t, x;\,T, y\bigr)\bigr],
\quad
\lim_{T \to t}\,p(t,x;\,T,y)
\;=\;
\delta_{y}(x).$$

For $T > r > t$, the Markov property implies

$$p(t, x;\,T, y)
\;=\;
\int_{-\infty}^{\infty}
p\bigl(t, x;\,r, z\bigr)\,
p\bigl(r, z;\,T, y\bigr)
\,dz.$$

Differentiate both sides w.r.t. $r$:

$$0
\;=\;
\int_{-\infty}^{\infty}
\Bigl[
\frac{\partial}{\partial r}\,p\bigl(t, x;\,r, z\bigr)\,\cdot\,p\bigl(r, z;\,T, y\bigr)
\;+\;
p\bigl(t, x;\,r, z\bigr)\,\cdot\,
\frac{\partial}{\partial r}\,p\bigl(r, z;\,T, y\bigr)
\Bigr]\,dz.$$

From the backward Kolmogorov equation:

$$\frac{\partial}{\partial r}\,p\bigl(r, z;\,T, y\bigr)
\;=\;
-\,A\,p\bigl(r, z;\,T, y\bigr).$$

Substitute into the integral:

$$0
\;=\;
\int_{-\infty}^{\infty}
\Bigl[
\frac{\partial}{\partial r}\,p\bigl(t, x;\,r, z\bigr)\,\cdot\,p\bigl(r, z;\,T, y\bigr)
\;-\;
p\bigl(t, x;\,r, z\bigr)\,\cdot\,
A\,p\bigl(r, z;\,T, y\bigr)
\Bigr]
\,dz.$$

By definition of the adjoint operator $A^{*}$:

$$\int_{-\infty}^{\infty}
\bigl[
\frac{\partial}{\partial r}\,p\bigl(t, x;\,r, z\bigr)
\;-\;
A^{*}\,p\bigl(t, x;\,r, z\bigr)
\bigr]\,
p\bigl(r, z;\,T, y\bigr)
\,dz
\;=\;
0.$$

Since $p(r,z;\,T,y)$ can be arbitrary, the bracket must vanish:

$$\frac{\partial}{\partial r}\,p\bigl(t, x;\,r,z\bigr)
\;=\;
A^{*}\bigl[p\bigl(t, x;\,r,z\bigr)\bigr].$$

Relabel $r \to T$ and $z \to y$, yielding the forward Kolmogorov equation:

$$\frac{\partial}{\partial T}\,p\bigl(t, x;\,T, y\bigr)
\;=\;
A^{*}\!\bigl[p\bigl(t, x;\,T, y\bigr)\bigr],
\quad
\lim_{T \to t}\,p(t,x;\,T,y)
\;=\;
\delta_{y}(x).$$

Finally,

$$A^{*}\,g(x)
\;=\;
-\sum_{i}\,\frac{\partial}{\partial x_{i}}
\bigl[\mu_{i}(x)\,g(x)\bigr]
\;+\;
\frac12\,
\sum_{i,j}\,
\frac{\partial^2}{\partial x_{i}\,\partial x_{j}}
\Bigl[
\bigl(\sigma(x)\,\sigma(x)^{\mathsf{T}}\bigr)_{ij}\,g(x)
\Bigr].$$

== See also ==
- Feynman–Kac formula
- Fokker–Planck equation
- Kolmogorov equations
