= Klein–Kramers equation =

Partial differential equation

In physics and mathematics, the Klein–Kramers equation or sometimes referred as Kramers–Chandrasekhar equation is a partial differential equation that describes the probability density function f (r, p, t) of a Brownian particle in phase space (r, p). It is a special case of the Fokker–Planck equation.

In one spatial dimension, f is a function of three independent variables: the scalars x, p, and t. In this case, the Klein–Kramers equation is
$$\frac{\partial f}{\partial t} + \frac{p}{m} \frac{\partial f}{\partial x} = \xi \frac{\partial}{\partial p} \left( p \, f \right) + \frac{\partial}{\partial p} \left( \frac{dV}{dx} \, f \right) + m\xi k_{\mathrm{B}} T \, \frac{\partial^2 f}{\partial p^2}$$
where V(x) is the external potential, m is the particle mass, ξ is the friction (drag) coefficient, T is the temperature, and k_{B} is the Boltzmann constant. In d spatial dimensions, the equation is
$$\frac{\partial f}{\partial t} + \frac{1}{m} \mathbf{p} \cdot \nabla_{\mathbf{r}} f = \xi \nabla_{\mathbf{p}} \cdot \left( \mathbf{p} \, f \right) + \nabla_{\mathbf{p}} \cdot \left( \nabla V(\mathbf{r}) \, f \right) + m \xi k_{\mathrm{B}} T \, \nabla_{\mathbf{p}}^2 f$$
Here $\nabla_{\mathbf{r}}$ and $\nabla_{\mathbf{p}}$ are the gradient operator with respect to r and p, and $\nabla_{\mathbf{p}}^2$ is the Laplacian with respect to p.

The fractional Klein-Kramers equation is a generalization that incorporates anomalous diffusion by way of fractional calculus.

== Physical basis ==
The physical model underlying the Klein–Kramers equation is that of an underdamped Brownian particle. Unlike standard Brownian motion, which is overdamped, underdamped Brownian motion takes the friction to be finite, in which case the momentum remains an independent degree of freedom.

Mathematically, a particle's state is described by its position r and momentum p, which evolve in time according to the Langevin equations
$$\begin{align}
\dot{\mathbf{r}} &= \frac{\mathbf{p}}{m}  \\
\dot{\mathbf{p}} &= -\xi \, \mathbf{p} - \nabla V(\mathbf{r}) + \sqrt{2 m \xi k_{\mathrm{B}} T} \boldsymbol{\eta}(t), \qquad \langle \boldsymbol{\eta}^{\mathrm{T}}(t) \boldsymbol{\eta}(t') \rangle = \mathbf{I} \delta(t-t')
\end{align}$$
Here $\boldsymbol{\eta}(t)$ is d-dimensional Gaussian white noise, which models the thermal fluctuations of p in a background medium of temperature T. $\boldsymbol{\eta}$ is a row vector, making $\langle \boldsymbol{\eta}^{\mathrm{T}}(t) \boldsymbol{\eta}(t')\rangle$ an outer product; $\mathbf{I}$ is the d by d identity matrix. These equations are analogous to Newton's second law of motion, but due to the noise term $\boldsymbol{\eta}(t)$ are stochastic ("random") rather than deterministic.

The dynamics can also be described in terms of a probability density function f (r, p, t), which gives the probability, at time t, of finding a particle at position r and with momentum p. By averaging over the stochastic trajectories from the Langevin equations, f (r, p, t) can be shown to obey the Klein–Kramers equation.

== Solution in free space ==
The d-dimensional free-space problem sets the force equal to zero, and considers solutions on $\mathbb{R}^{\mathrm{d}}$ that decay to 0 at infinity, i.e., f (r, p, t) → 0 as |r| → ∞.

For the 1D free-space problem with point-source initial condition, f (x, p, 0) = δ(x - x')δ(p - p'), the solution which is a bivariate Gaussian in x and p was solved by Subrahmanyan Chandrasekhar (who also devised a general methodology to solve problems in the presence of a potential) in 1943:
$$\begin{align}
f(x,p,t) =
\frac{1}{2 \pi  \sigma_X \sigma_P \sqrt{1-\beta^2}}
\exp\left(
-\frac{1}{2(1-\beta^2)}\left[
\frac{(x-\mu_X)^2}{\sigma_X^2} +
\frac{(p-\mu_P)^2}{\sigma_P^2} -
\frac{2\beta(x-\mu_X)(p-\mu_P)}{\sigma_X \sigma_P}
\right]
\right),
\end{align}$$
where
$$\begin{align}
&\sigma^2_X = \frac{k_{\mathrm{B}} T}{m \xi^2} \left[1 + 2 \xi t -  \left(2 - e^{-\xi t}\right)^2 \right]; \qquad  \sigma^2_P = m k_{\mathrm{B}} T \left(1 - e^{-2 \xi t} \right) \\[1ex]
&\beta = \frac{k_\text{B} T}{\xi \sigma_X \sigma_P} \left(1 - e^{-\xi t}\right)^2 \\[1ex]
&\mu_X = x' + (m \xi)^{-1} \left(1 - e^{-\xi t} \right) p' ; \qquad \mu_P = p' e^{-\xi t}.
\end{align}$$
This special solution is also known as the Green's function G(x, x', p, p', t), and can be used to construct the general solution, i.e., the solution for generic initial conditions f (x, p, 0):
$$f(x, p, t) = \iint G(x, x', p, p', t) f(x',p',0) \, dx' dp'$$
Similarly, the 3D free-space problem with point-source initial condition f (r, p, 0) = δ(r - r') δ(p - p') has solution
$$\begin{align}
f(\mathbf{r}, \mathbf{p}, t) = \frac{1}{\left(2 \pi \sigma_X \sigma_P \sqrt{1 - \beta^2}\right)^3} \exp\left[-\frac{1}{2(1-\beta^2)} \left( \frac{|\mathbf{r} - \boldsymbol{\mu}_X|^2}{\sigma_X^2} +  \frac{|\mathbf{p} - \boldsymbol{\mu}_P|^2}{\sigma_P^2} -  \frac{2 \beta (\mathbf{r} - \boldsymbol{\mu}_X) \cdot (\mathbf{p} - \boldsymbol{\mu}_P)}{\sigma_X \sigma_P} \right) \right]
\end{align}$$
with $\boldsymbol{\mu}_X = \mathbf{r'} + (m \xi)^{-1}(1-e^{-\xi t}) \mathbf{p'}$, $\boldsymbol{\mu}_P = \mathbf{p'}e^{-\xi t}$, and $\sigma_X$ and $\sigma_P$ defined as in the 1D solution.

=== Asymptotic behavior ===
Under certain conditions, the solution of the free-space Klein–Kramers equation behaves asymptotically like a diffusion process. For example, if
$$\int_{-\infty}^{\infty} \int_{-\infty}^{\infty} f(x,p,0) \, dp \, dx < \infty$$
then the density $\Phi(x,t) \equiv \int_{-\infty}^{\infty} f(x,p,t) \, dp$ satisfies
$$\frac{\Phi(x,t) - \Phi_D(x,t)}{\Phi_D(x,t)} = \mathcal{O}\left(\frac{1}{t} \right) \quad \text{as } t \rightarrow \infty$$
where $\Phi_D(x,t) = (\sqrt{2 \pi t} \sigma_X^2)^{-1/2} \exp \left[-x^2/(2 \sigma_X^2 t) \right]$ is the free-space Green's function for the diffusion equation.

== Solution near boundaries ==
The 1D, time-independent, force-free (F = 0) version of the Klein–Kramers equation can be solved on a semi-infinite or bounded domain by separation of variables. The solution typically develops a boundary layer that varies rapidly in space and is non-analytic at the boundary itself.

A well-posed problem prescribes boundary data on only half of the p domain: the positive half (p > 0) at the left boundary and the negative half (p < 0) at the right. For a semi-infinite problem defined on 0 < x < ∞, boundary conditions may be given as:
$$\begin{align}
&f(0, p) =\left\{
\begin{array}{cc}
g(p) & p > 0 \\
\text{unspecified} & p < 0
\end{array} \right. \\
&f(x,p) \rightarrow 0 \text{  as } x \rightarrow \infty
\end{align}$$
for some function g(p).

For a point-source boundary condition, the solution has an exact expression in terms of infinite sum and products: Here, the result is stated for the non-dimensional version of the Klein–Kramers equation:
$$w \frac{\partial f(z,w)}{\partial z} = \frac{\partial}{\partial w}\left[ w f(z,w) \right] + \frac{\partial^2 f(z,w)}{\partial w^2}$$
In this representation, length and time are measured in units of $\ell = \sqrt{k_B T/(m \xi^2)}$ and $\tau = \xi^{-1}$, such that $z \equiv x/\ell$ and $w \equiv p/(m \ell \xi)$ are both dimensionless. If the boundary condition at z = 0 is g(w) = δ(w - w_{0}), where w_{0} > 0, then the solution is
$$f(x, w) = \frac{w_0 e^{-w^2/2}}{\sqrt{2 \pi}} \left[w_0 - \zeta\left(\frac{1}{2}\right) - \sum_{n=1}^{\infty} \frac{G_{-n}(w_0)}{2nQ_n} + \sum_{n=1}^{\infty} S_n(w_0) G_n(w) e^{-\sqrt{n} z} \right]$$
where
$$\begin{align}
G_{\pm n}(w) &= (-1)^{n} 2^{-n/2} e^{-n} (n!)^{-1/2} e^{\pm \sqrt{n} w} H_n\left(\frac{w}{\sqrt{2}} \mp \sqrt{2 n} \right), \qquad n = 1, 2, 3, \ldots \\[1ex]
S_n(w_0) &= \frac{G_n(w_0)}{2 \sqrt{2}} - \frac{1}{2n Q_n} - \sum_{m=1}^{\infty} \frac{G_{-m}(w_0)}{4 \left(m \sqrt{n} + \sqrt{m} n \right) Q_m Q_n} \\[2ex]
Q_n &= \lim_{N \to \infty} \sqrt{n!(N-1)!} \; e^{2\sqrt{N n}} \left[\prod_{r=0}^{N+n-1} \left(\sqrt{r} + \sqrt{n} \right) \right]^{-1}
\end{align}$$
This result can be obtained by the Wiener–Hopf method. However, practical use of the expression is limited by slow convergence of the series, particularly for values of w close to 0.

== See also ==
- Fokker–Planck equation
- Ornstein–Uhlenbeck process
- Wiener process
- Linear transport theory
- Neutron transport
