= Kramers–Heisenberg formula =

For the cross section for scattering of a photon by an atomic electron

The Kramers–Heisenberg dispersion formula is an expression for the cross section for scattering of a photon by an atomic electron. It was derived before the advent of quantum mechanics by Hendrik Kramers and Werner Heisenberg in 1925, based on the correspondence principle applied to the classical dispersion formula for light. The quantum mechanical derivation was given by Paul Dirac in 1927.

The Kramers–Heisenberg formula was an important achievement when it was published, explaining the notion of "negative absorption" (stimulated emission), the Thomas–Reiche–Kuhn sum rule, and inelastic scattering — where the energy of the scattered photon may be larger or smaller than that of the incident photon — thereby anticipating the discovery of the Raman effect.

== Equation ==
The Kramers–Heisenberg formula for second order processes is
$$\frac{d^2 \sigma}{d\Omega_{k^\prime}d(\hbar \omega_k^\prime)}=\frac{\omega_k^\prime}{\omega_k}\sum_{|f\rangle}\left | \sum_{|n\rangle} \frac{\langle f | T_2 | n \rangle \langle n | T_1 | i \rangle}{E_i - E_n + \hbar \omega_k + i \frac{\Gamma_n}{2}}\right |^2 \delta (E_i - E_f + \hbar \omega_k - \hbar \omega_k^\prime)$$
It represents the probability of the emission of photons of energy $\hbar \omega_k^\prime$ in the solid angle $d\Omega_{k^\prime}$ (centered in the $k^\prime$ direction), after the excitation of the system with photons of energy $\hbar \omega_k$. $|i\rangle, |n\rangle, |f\rangle$ are the initial, intermediate and final states of the system with energy $E_i , E_n , E_f$ respectively. $T_1$ and $T_2$ are the relevant transition operators. $\Gamma_n$ is the intrinsic linewidth of the intermediate state. The delta function ensures the energy conservation during the whole process, but is often represented as a Lorentzian:
$$\delta(E_i - E_f + \hbar \omega_k - \hbar \omega_k^\prime) \rightarrow \frac{\Gamma_f / 2\pi}{(E_i - E_f + \hbar \omega_k - \hbar \omega_k^\prime)^2 + \Gamma_f^2/4}$$
Here, $\Gamma_f$ is the linewidth of the final state.
