= Eric Anders Carlen =

American mathematician

Eric Anders Carlen is a mathematician who is a distinguished professor emeritus at Rutgers University–New Brunswick. He is a fellow of the American Mathematical Society since 2016, for "contributions to functional analysis, mathematical physics, and probability".

He obtained his Ph.D. from Princeton University in 1984 under the supervision of Edward Nelson.
