= Edward Nelson =

American mathematician (1932–2014)

- Edward Nelson
- Born: May 4, 1932; Decatur, Georgia
- Died: September 10, 2014 (aged 82); Princeton, New Jersey
- Citizenship: American
- Education: University of Chicago (MS, 1953); University of Chicago (PhD, 1955)
- Known for: Internal set theory; Stochastic quantum mechanics; Stochastic quantization; Hadwiger–Nelson problem; Nelson's axioms
- Spouses: Nancy Wong Nelson; Sarah Jones Nelson
- Children: 2
- Awards: Leroy P. Steele Prize
- Scientific career
- Fields: Physics; Mathematics
- Workplaces: Institute for Advanced Study; Princeton University
- Thesis: On the Operator Theory of Markoff Processes
- Doctoral advisor: Irving Segal
- Notable students: Eric Anders Carlen; Richard M. Dudley; John D. Lafferty; Greg Lawler

Edward Nelson (May 4, 1932 – September 10, 2014) was an American mathematician known for his work on mathematical physics and mathematical logic. In mathematical logic, he was noted especially for his internal set theory, and views on ultrafinitism and the consistency of arithmetic. In philosophy of mathematics he advocated the view of formalism rather than platonism or intuitionism. He also wrote on the relationship between religion and mathematics. He was professor in the Department of Mathematics at Princeton University.

== Biography ==
Edward Nelson was born in Decatur, Georgia, in 1932. He spent his early childhood in Rome where his father worked for the Italian YMCA. At the advent of World War II, Nelson moved with his mother to New York City, where he attended high school at the Bronx High School of Science. His father, who spoke fluent Russian, stayed in St. Petersburg in connection with issues related to prisoners of war. After the war, his family returned to Italy and he attended the Liceo Scientifico Giovanni Verga in Rome.

He received his Ph.D. in 1955 from the University of Chicago, where he worked with Irving Segal. He was a member of the Institute for Advanced Study from 1956 to 1959. He held a position at Princeton University starting in 1959, attaining the rank of professor there in 1964 and retiring in 2013.

In 2012 he became a fellow of the American Mathematical Society. He died in Princeton, New Jersey, on September 10, 2014.

== Academic work ==
=== Stochastic quantum mechanics ===
Nelson made contributions to the theory of infinite-dimensional group representations, the mathematical treatment of quantum field theory, the use of stochastic processes in quantum mechanics, and the reformulation of probability theory in terms of non-standard analysis. For many years he worked on mathematical physics and probability theory, and he retained a residual interest in these fields, particularly in connection with possible extensions of stochastic mechanics to field theory.

=== Four color problem ===
In 1950, Nelson formulated a popular variant of the four color problem: What is the chromatic number, denoted $\chi$, of the plane? In more detail, what is the smallest number of colors sufficient for coloring the points of the Euclidean plane such that no two points of the same color are unit distance apart? We know by simple arguments that 4 ≤ χ ≤ 7. The problem was introduced to a wide mathematical audience by Martin Gardner in his October 1960 Mathematical Games column. The chromatic number problem, also now known as the Hadwiger–Nelson problem, was a favorite of Paul Erdős, who mentioned it frequently in his problems lectures. In 2018, Aubrey de Grey showed that χ ≥ 5.

=== Foundations of mathematics ===
In the later part of his career, he worked on mathematical logic and the foundations of mathematics. One of his goals was to extend IST (Internal Set Theory—a version of a portion of Abraham Robinson's non-standard analysis) in a natural manner that includes external functions and sets, in a way that provides an external function with specified properties unless there is a finitary obstacle to its existence. Other work centered on fragments of arithmetic, studying the divide between those theories interpretable in Raphael Robinson's arithmetic and those that are not; computational complexity, including the problem of whether P is equal to NP; and automated proof checking.

In September 2011, Nelson announced he had proved that Peano arithmetic was logically inconsistent. An error was found in the proof by Terence Tao, and Nelson retracted the claim.

== Publications ==
=== Selected papers ===
- Nelson, Edward (1966). "Derivation of the Schrödinger Equation from Newtonian Mechanics" (PDF). Physical Review. 150 (4): 1079–1085. Bibcode:1966PhRv..150.1079N. doi:10.1103/PhysRev.150.1079. ISSN 0031-899X.
- Nelson, E. (1986). "Field Theory and the Future of Stochastic Mechanics". In Albeverio, S.; Casati, G.; Merlini, D. (eds.). Stochastic Processes in Classical and Quantum Systems. Lecture Notes in Physics. Vol. 262. Berlin: Springer-Verlag. pp. 438–469. doi:10.1007/3-540-17166-5. ISBN 978-3-662-13589-1. OCLC 864657129.

=== Books ===
- Nelson, E. (1967). Dynamical theories of Brownian Motion. Princeton: Princeton University Press. ISBN 978-0-691-07950-9. OCLC 769464.
- Nelson, E. (1967). Tensor Analysis. Princeton: Princeton University Press. ISBN 9781400879236. LCCN 67028943. OCLC 988417.
- Nelson, E. (1969). Topics in Dynamics: I: Flows. Princeton: Princeton University Press. ISBN 0-691-08080-1. LCCN 79108265. OCLC 59197.
- Nelson, E. (1985). Quantum Fluctuations. Princeton: Princeton University Press. ISBN 0-691-08378-9. LCCN 84026449. OCLC 11549759.
- Nelson, E. (1986). Predicative Arithmetic. Princeton: Princeton University Press. ISBN 0-691-08455-6. LCCN 86018730. OCLC 14001745.
- Nelson, E. (1987). Radically Elementary Probability Theory. Princeton: Princeton University Press. ISBN 0-691-08473-4. LCCN 87003160. OCLC 15591889.

== See also ==
- Hidden variable theory
- Influence of non-standard analysis
- Stochastic process
- Stochastic quantum mechanics
- Stochastic electrodynamics
