= Jump process =

Stochastic process with discrete movements

A jump process is a loose term describing a stochastic process that has discrete movements, called jumps. The jumps may arrive at fixed times (e.g., binomial model), predictable times (e.g., jump occurs when, say, a one-dimensional Brownian motion hits, say, value 1) or at totally inaccessible stopping times (e.g., the jumps of a Poisson process). The jumps may have finite activity (only finitely many jumps on any finite time interval), finite variation (the sum of the absolute value of all jumps is finite on every finite time interval), or infinite variation.

== Definition of jumps ==
In most applications, the paths of a stochastic process are modelled as right-continuous with left limits and the jump is then the difference between the current value and the left limit; mathematically $\Delta X_t = X_t - X_{t-}$, where $X_{t-} = \lim_{s\uparrow t}X_s$. There are also circumstances when it is convenient to allow for a double jump at time $t$, one just before $t$ and one just after $t$. In such case, $X$ is no longer right-continuous but it is assumed to have right limit $X_{t+} = \lim_{s\downarrow t}X_s$ and the second jump is defined as $\Delta^+ X_t = X_{t+}-X_t$.

== Decomposition ==
It is typically possible to decompose a process with jumps into a continuous part and a "pure-jump part" but such decomposition is often not unique. The non-uniqueness notably occurs for Lévy processes with jumps of infinite variation. Despite such non-uniqueness, the terminology "pure-jump Lévy process" is in common use to denote the subset of Lévy processes whose continuous quadratic variation is zero (i.e., those Lévy processes that have no Brownian motion component). One may also speak of pure-jump processes in the stricter sense of being equal to the sum of their jumps. This is certainly possible if the jumps are of finite variation but sometimes even beyond. For example, it is known that the jumps of a semimartingale at predictable times are summable in the semimartingale topology, which uniquely defines a discrete-time component of every semimartingale as the sum of its jumps at predictable times.

== Applications ==
- In finance, Paul Samuelson introduced the geometric Brownian motion (GBM) and geometric pure-jump Lévy process as alternative continuous-time models for stock price in his seminal paper "Rational Theory of Warrant Pricing". Samuelson's GBM model is now popularly known as the Black–Scholes option pricing model. For early examples of option pricing with jumps see.

== See also ==
- Poisson process, an example of a jump process
- Continuous-time Markov chain (CTMC), an example of a jump process and a generalization of the Poisson process
- Counting process, an example of a jump process and a generalization of the Poisson process in a different direction than that of CTMCs
- Interacting particle system, an example of a jump process
- Kolmogorov equations (continuous-time Markov chains)
