= Hans Kramers =

Dutch physicist (1894–1952)

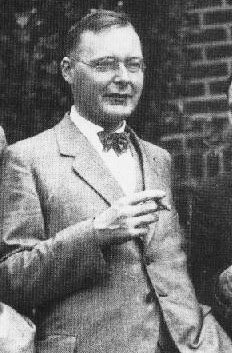
- Hans Kramers in July-August 1928, Ann Arbor
- Born: Hendrik Anthony Kramers; 17 December 1894; Rotterdam, Netherlands
- Died: 24 April 1952 (aged 57); Oegstgeest, Netherlands
- Education: Leiden University
- Known for: Kramers transition matrix Kramers theory of reaction rates Kramers' law Kramers' opacity law Kramers' degeneracy theorem Kramers–Anderson superexchange Kramers–Gaunt factor Kramers–Heisenberg formula Kramers–Henneberger frame Kramers–Kronig relations Kramers-Moyal expansion Kramers–Wannier duality Bohr–Kramers–Slater theory Klein–Kramers equation Wentzel–Kramers–Brillouin approximation Chain reaction Thermoacoustics; Transfer-matrix method
- Awards: Lorentz Medal (1947); Hughes Medal (1951)
- Scientific career
- Fields: Physics
- Doctoral advisor: Niels Bohr; Paul Ehrenfest
- Doctoral students: Dirk ter Haar; Nico van Kampen; Tjalling Koopmans

Hendrik Anthony "Hans" Kramers (17 December 1894 – 24 April 1952) was a Dutch physicist who worked with Niels Bohr to understand how electromagnetic waves interact with matter and made important contributions to quantum mechanics and statistical physics.

== Background and education ==
Hans Kramers was born on 17 December 1894 in Rotterdam. the son of Hendrik Kramers, a physician, and Jeanne Susanne Breukelman.

In 1912 Hans finished secondary education (HBS) in Rotterdam, and studied mathematics and physics at the University of Leiden, where he obtained a master's degree in 1916. Kramers wanted to obtain foreign experience during his doctoral research, but his first choice of supervisor, Max Born in Göttingen, was not reachable because of the First World War. Because Denmark was neutral in this war, as was the Netherlands, he travelled (by ship, overland was impossible) to Copenhagen, where he visited unannounced the then still relatively unknown Niels Bohr. Bohr took him on as a Ph.D. candidate and Kramers prepared his dissertation under Bohr's direction. Although Kramers did most of his doctoral research (on intensities of atomic transitions) in Copenhagen, he obtained his formal Ph.D. under Ehrenfest in Leiden, on 8 May 1919.

Kramers enjoyed music, and played cello and piano.

== Academic career ==
He worked for almost ten years in Bohr's group, becoming an associate professor at the University of Copenhagen. He played a role in the ill-fated BKS theory of 1924-5. Kramers left Denmark in 1926 and returned to the Netherlands. He became a full professor in theoretical physics at Utrecht University, where he supervised Tjalling Koopmans.

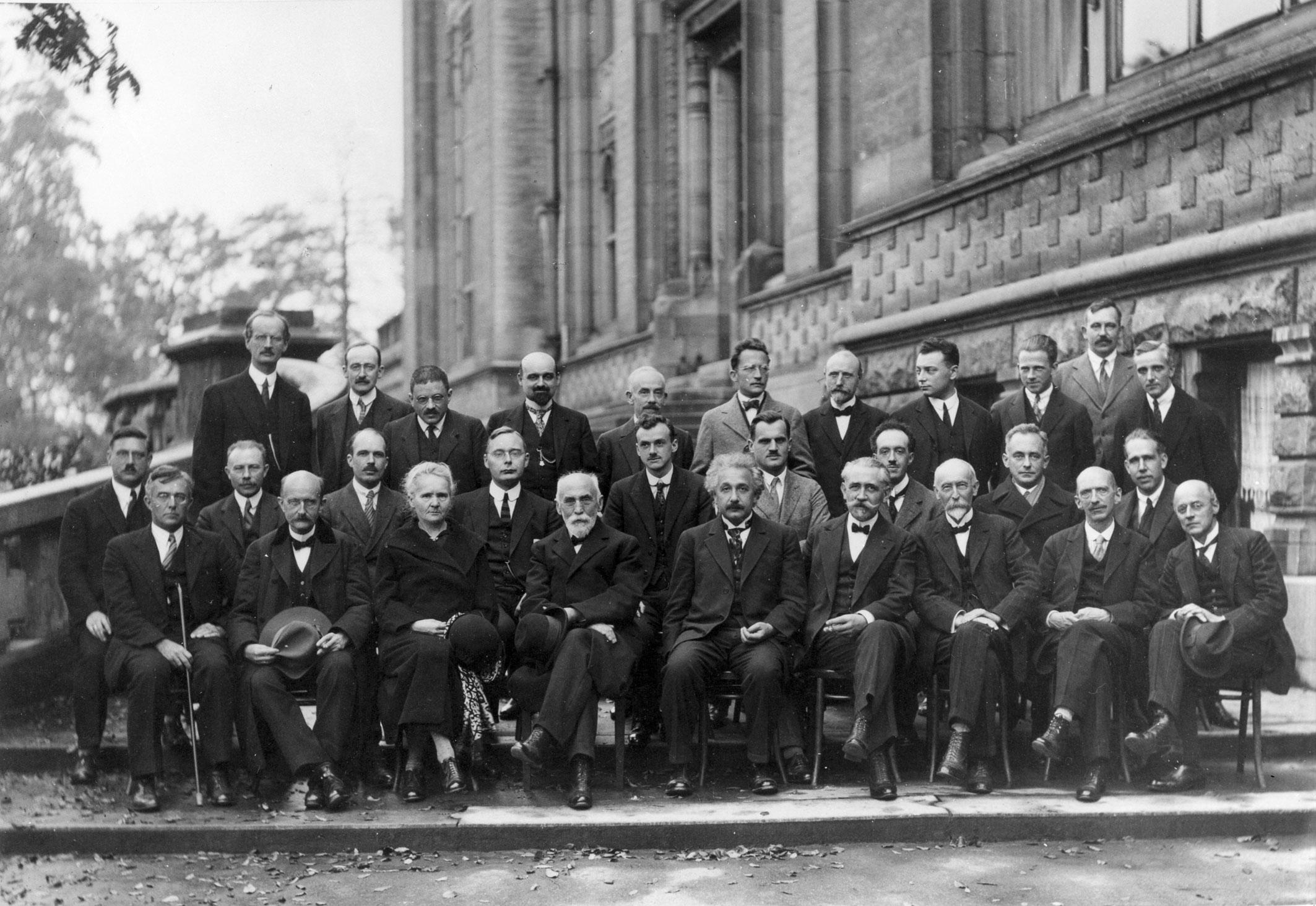
Kramers (second row, fourth left) at Fifth Solvay Conference

In 1925, with Werner Heisenberg he developed the Kramers–Heisenberg dispersion formula, and in 1926 he was one of the authors of the WKB method. He is also credited with introducing in 1948 the concept of renormalization into quantum field theory, although his approach was nonrelativistic. He is also credited for the Kramers–Kronig relations with Ralph Kronig which are mathematical equations relating real and imaginary parts of complex functions constrained by causality. One further refers to a Kramers turnover when the rate of thermally activated barrier crossing as a function of the damping goes through a maximum, thereby undergoing a transition between the energy diffusion and spatial diffusion regimes. He is also known for Kramers' degeneracy theorem.

In 1934 he left Utrecht and succeeded Paul Ehrenfest in Leiden. From 1931 until his death he held also a cross appointment at Delft University of Technology.

Kramers was one of the founders of the Mathematisch Centrum in Amsterdam.

== Family ==
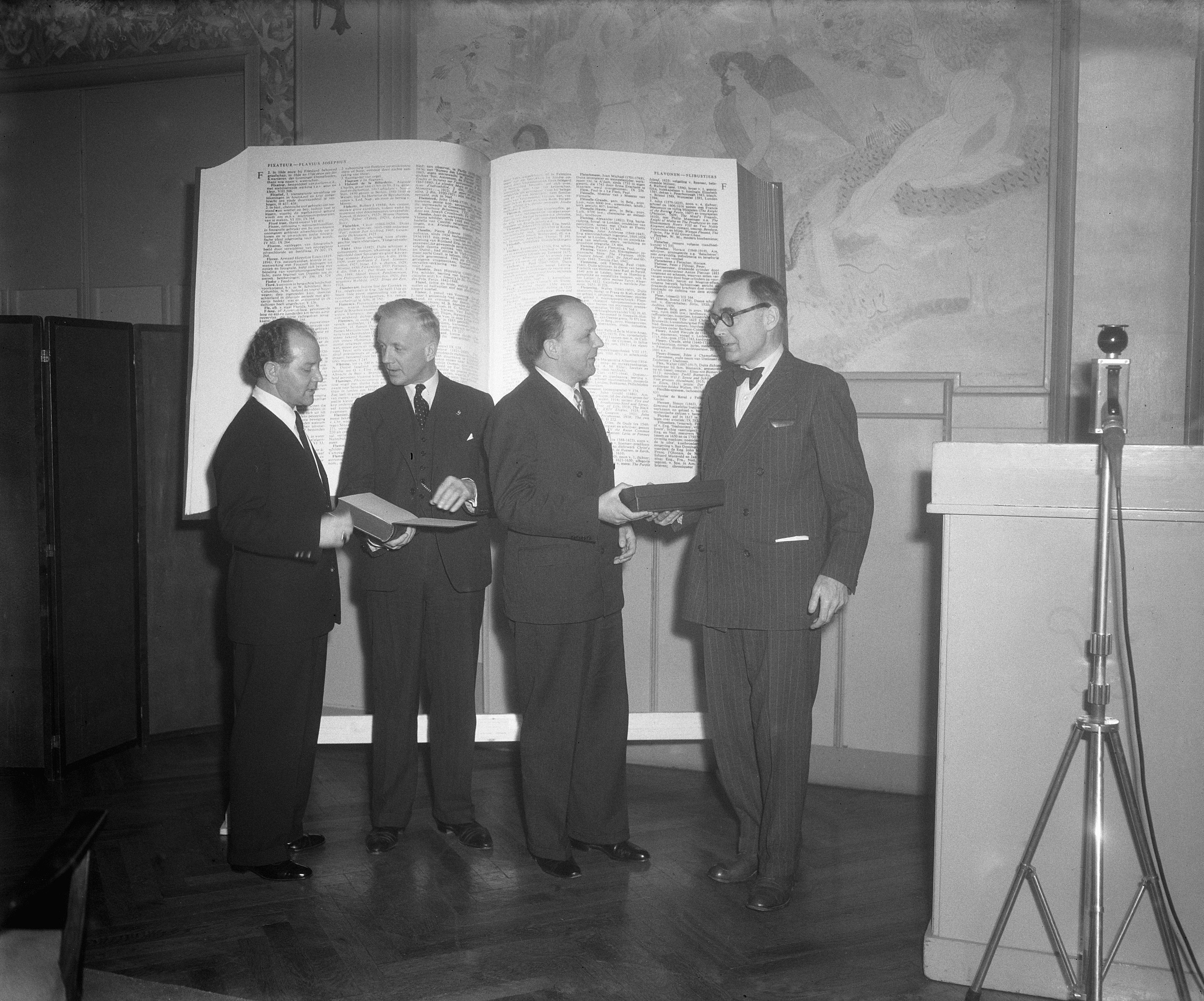
Presentation of Part 10 of the Eerste Nederlandse Systematisch Ingerichte Encyclopaedie (1952). Left to right: Frederic von Eugen, Arnold Jan d'Ailly, Hendrik Jan Reinink, Hans Kramers

On 25 October 1920 he was married to Anna Petersen. They had three daughters and one son.

== Recognition ==
Kramers became member of the Royal Netherlands Academy of Arts and Sciences in 1929, he was forced to resign in 1942. He joined the Academy again in 1945. He was an International member of the American Philosophical Society. Kramers won the Lorentz Medal in 1947 and Hughes Medal in 1951.

== See also ==
- Spin (physics)
- Stark effect
