= Kolmogorov equations =

Equations characterizing continuous-time Markov processes

In probability theory, Kolmogorov equations characterize continuous-time Markov processes. In particular, they describe how the probability of a continuous-time Markov process in a certain state changes over time. There are four distinct equations: the Kolmogorov forward equation for continuous processes, now understood to be identical to the Fokker–Planck equation, the Kolmogorov forward equation for jump processes, and two Kolmogorov backward equations for processes with and without discontinuous jumps.

== Diffusion processes vs. jump processes ==
Writing in 1931, Andrey Kolmogorov started from the theory of discrete time Markov processes, which are described by the Chapman–Kolmogorov equation, and sought to derive a theory of continuous time Markov processes by extending this equation. He found that there are two kinds of continuous time Markov processes, depending on the assumed behavior over small intervals of time:

If you assume that "in a small time interval there is an overwhelming probability that the state will remain unchanged; however, if it changes, the change may be radical", then you are led to what are called jump processes.

The other case leads to processes such as those "represented by diffusion and by Brownian motion; there it is certain that some change will occur in any time interval, however small; only, here it is certain that the changes during small time intervals will be also small".

For each of these two kinds of processes, Kolmogorov derived a forward and a backward system of equations (four in all).

== History ==
The equations are named after Andrey Kolmogorov since they were highlighted in his 1931 foundational work.

William Feller, in 1949, used the names "forward equation" and "backward equation" for his more general version of the Kolmogorov's pair, in both jump and diffusion processes. Much later, in 1956, he referred to the equations for the jump process as "Kolmogorov forward equations" and "Kolmogorov backward equations".

Other authors, such as Motoo Kimura, referred to the diffusion (Fokker–Planck) equation as Kolmogorov forward equation, a name that has persisted.

== The modern view ==
- In the context of a continuous-time Markov process with jumps, see Kolmogorov equations (Markov jump process). In particular, in natural sciences the forward equation is also known as master equation.
- In the context of a diffusion process, for the backward Kolmogorov equations see Kolmogorov backward equations (diffusion). The forward Kolmogorov equation is also known as Fokker–Planck equation.

== Continuous-time Markov chains ==
The original derivation of the equations by Kolmogorov starts with the Chapman–Kolmogorov equation (Kolmogorov called it fundamental equation) for time-continuous and differentiable Markov processes on a finite, discrete state space. In this formulation, it is assumed that the probabilities $P(x,s;y,t)$ are continuous and differentiable functions of $t > s$, where $x, y \in \Omega$ (the state space) and $t > s, t,s\in\mathbb R_{\ge0}$ are the final and initial times, respectively. Also, adequate limit properties for the derivatives are assumed. Feller derives the equations under slightly different conditions, starting with the concept of purely discontinuous Markov process and then formulating them for more general state spaces. Feller proves the existence of solutions of probabilistic character to the Kolmogorov forward equations and Kolmogorov backward equations under natural conditions.

For the case of a countable state space we put $i,j$ in place of $x,y$. The Kolmogorov forward equations read

$$\frac{\partial P_{ij}}{\partial t}(s;t) = \sum_k P_{ik}(s;t) A_{kj}(t)$$,

where $A(t)$ is the transition rate matrix (also known as the generator matrix),

while the Kolmogorov backward equations are

$$\frac{\partial P_{ij}}{\partial s}(s;t) = -\sum_k  P_{kj}(s;t) A_{ik}(s)$$

The functions $P_{ij}(s;t)$ are continuous and differentiable in both time arguments. They represent the probability that the system that was in state $i$ at time $s$ jumps to state $j$ at some later time $t > s$. The continuous quantities $A_{ij}(t)$ satisfy

$$A_{ij}(t) = \left[\frac{\partial P_{ij}}{\partial u}(t;u)\right]_{u=t},  \quad A_{jk}(t) \ge 0,\ j\ne k, \quad \sum_k A_{jk}(t) =0.$$

=== Relation with the generating function ===
Still in the discrete state case, letting $s=0$ and assuming that the system initially is found in state $i$, the Kolmogorov forward equations describe an initial-value problem for finding the probabilities of the process, given the quantities $A_{jk}(t)$. We write $p_k(t)= P_{ik}(0;t)$ where $\sum_{k}p_k(t) = 1$, then

$$\frac{d p_k}{dt}(t) = \sum_j A_{jk}(t) p_j(t);\quad p_k(0)=\delta_{ik}, \qquad k=0,1,\dots .$$

For the case of a pure death process with constant rates the only nonzero coefficients are $A_{j,j-1}=\mu_j,\ j\ge 1$. Letting

$$\Psi(x,t) = \sum_k x^k p_k(t),\quad$$

the system of equations can in this case be recast as a partial differential equation for ${\Psi}(x,t)$ with initial condition $\Psi (x,0)=x^i$. After some manipulations, the system of equations reads,

$$\frac{\partial \Psi}{\partial t}(x,t) = \mu (1-x)\frac{\partial{\Psi}}{\partial x}(x,t);\qquad \Psi(x,0)=x^i, \quad \Psi(1,t)=1.$$

== An example from biology ==
One example from biology is given below:

$$p_n' (t)= (n-1)\beta p_{n-1}(t) - n\beta p_{n}(t)$$

This equation is applied to model population growth with birth. Where $n$ is the population index, with reference the initial population, $\beta$ is the birth rate, and finally $p_n(t)=\Pr(N(t)=n)$, i.e. the probability of achieving a certain population size.

The analytical solution is:

$$p_n(t)= (n-1)\beta e^{-n\beta t} \int_0^t \! p_{n-1}(s)\,e^{n\beta s}\mathrm{d}s$$

This is a formula for the probability $p_n(t)$ in terms of the preceding ones, i.e. $p_{n-1}(t)$.

== See also ==
- Feynman–Kac formula
- Fokker–Planck equation
- Kolmogorov backward equations (diffusions)
