= Joyig script =

Brahmic writing system for the Dzongkha language

Jogyig Lhoyig • Mönyig • Drukyig མགྱོགས་ཡིག་ mgyogs yig
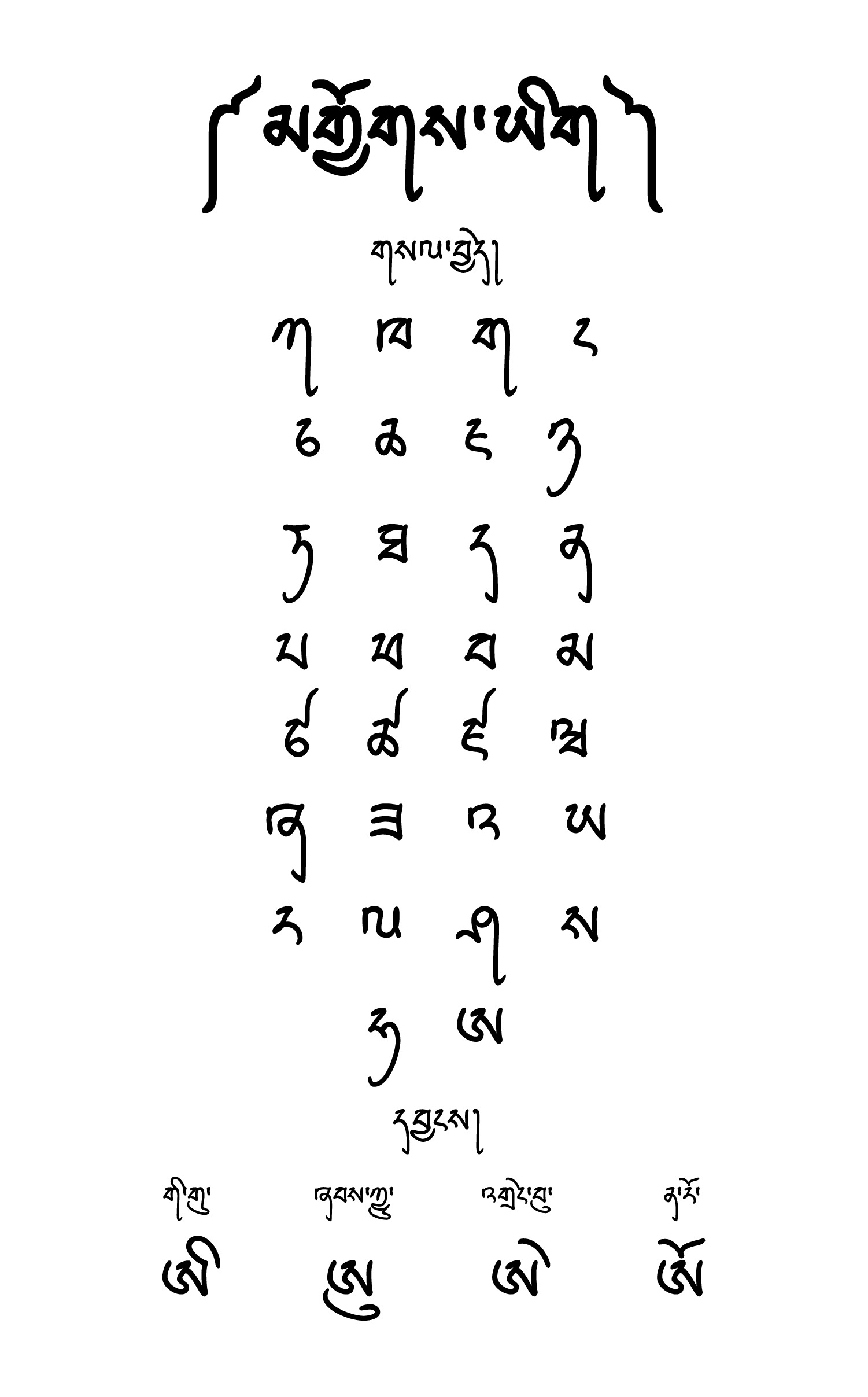
- Choksat (Alphabet) chart in Joyig style used in Bhutan
- Script type: Abugida (a cursive adaptation of the Tibetan script)
- Creator: Denma Tsemang
- Period: c. 8th c.e.–present
- Direction: Left-to-right
- Languages: Dzongkha

Related scripts
- Parent systems: Egyptian hieroglyphs: Proto-Sinaitic; Phoenician; Aramaic; Brahmi; Northern Brahmi; Gupta; Tibetan; Jogyig
- Sister systems: Umê script; Uchen script

ISO 15924
- ISO 15924: Tibt (330), Tibetan

Unicode
- Unicode alias: Tibetan
- Unicode range: U+0F00–U+0FFF (mapped to the Tibetan alphabet)

The Jôyi script or Jogyig (Dzongkha: མགྱོགས་ཡིག་) commonly referred to as the Bhutanese cursive script, is a distinct calligraphic style of the Tibetan script utilised for the Dzongkha language in Bhutan. Just as the Tibetan script developed distinct styles for formal (Üchen) and informal (Umê) contexts, the Bhutanese developed their own styles, known as Jogyig "cursive longhand" and Jôtshum "formal longhand". Jogyig is the Bhutanese equivalent for Umê, which is used for everyday handwriting.

Historically developed and used exclusively within Bhutan, Jogyig is characterised by its fluid, rapid, and continuous stroke structure, facilitating efficient handwritten communication. Known also as Mönyig (Mön script), Lhoyig (Southern script) or Drukyig (Bhutanese script), it is believed to have been drafted by the translator Denma Tsemang in the 8th century. It is considered halfway between the Üchen (དབུ་ཅན་) and Umê (ཁྱུག་ཡིག་) scripts. Because it is written quickly, it got its name Jogyig or "fast script". It is a syllabic segmental abugida with 30 consonants, 5 vowels and numerous symbols used in religious texts.

Presently, there is no standalone policy specifically for the status of Jogyig in Bhutan; however, it is widely used by government bodies, institutions, monastic groups and in everyday life. As most of the state's internal treasure texts, administrative documents, and correspondence were historically written in Jogyig, the script is a foundational component of Bhutan’s literature and cultural heritage. The Dzongkha Development Commission considers Jogyig to be the authentic script for Bhutanese.

== Etymology ==
According to traditional Bhutanese accounts, before the introduction of Buddhism, the region was sparsely populated and heavily forested. The area was historically referred to as the "Land of Snow-Clad Mountains and Ravines" (Khawa Ribrag gi Yul), and its inhabitants were known as Ribragpa.

According to the Gyalrab Lhoi Chojung (Tibetan: རྒྱལ་རབས་ལྷོའི་ཆོས་འབྱུང་, Wylie: rgyal rabs lho'i chos 'byung) (History of Southern Buddhism), subsequent settlements were established by figures exiled from India, including Prince Sindhu Raja, who established himself in Bumthang Chokhor alongside his ministers and subjects. He would later be known as Chakhar Gyalpo, among the first Kings of Bhutan. During the 8th century, he invited Padmasambhava (Guru Rinpoche) to the region, which introduced Buddhism into Bhutan. Following his arrival, the terms Mön Bumthang and Mön Paro emerged, with the broader region becoming known as Mönyul (Land of Mön) and its local script as Mönyig.

Tibetans referred to this script as Lhoyig (Southern script) because it originated south of the Tibetan Plateau. While the terms Mönyig and Lhoyig remained in use until the 19th century, the script's rapid, fluid execution led to the widespread adoption of the term Joyig (literally "fast script"). Today, it is primarily known as Joyig, though it is occasionally referred to as Drukyig (Bhutanese script).

== History and origins ==
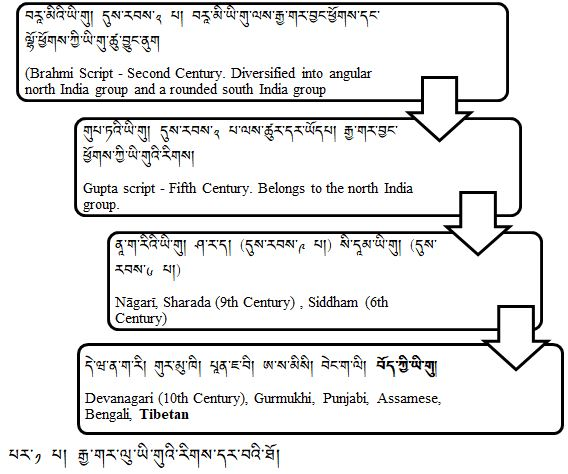
Evolution of Joyig script

Because the Uchen and Jogyig scripts used in Bhutan are similar to Tibetan scripts, the history of their forms is closely tied to the history of Tibetan writing. The origins of Tibetan writing trace back to Indian scripts. It is widely accepted that the Tibetan script was derived from the Gupta script of India. According to historical accounts, Tibetan Bonpos believe that scripts existed in Tibet even before Guru Rinpoche's arrival. During the reign of the 33rd Tibetan King, Songtsen Gampo, the minister Thonmi Sambhota was sent to India to study scripts. Among the many Indian scripts, the Tibetan and Bhutanese scripts appear most similar to the Gupta script.

The creation of Jogyig is traditionally attributed to Denma Tsemang, a disciple of Guru Rinpoche. Several scholars have documented different historical perspectives on its origins:

- Dasho Sangay Dorji's account: In the 8th century, King Sindhu Raja of Bumthang offered paper to the Tibetan King Trisong Detsen for the transcription of the Kangyur and Tengyur at Samye Monastery. In return, Guru Rinpoche brought Denma Tsemang to Bumthang to transcribe local Dharma teachings. Denma Tsemang is credited with inventing the Lhoyig (Southern Script) during this period to record these texts, which were later concealed as spiritual treasures (terma) at Kurjey Dorje Tsegpa.
- Ugyen Dorji's account: Denma Tsemang initially developed a semi-cursive script known as Jotsum. Over generations, as scribes required greater speed, Jotsum naturally evolved into the fully cursive Joyig. Historically, up to seven distinct scripts flourished in Bhutan, including standard block lettering (Tshugyig or Uchen) and various cursive forms.
- Khenpo Phuntsho Tashi's account: Drawing on ancient Buddhist records citing 64 classical scripts, Tashi posits that Jogyig may have pre-existed Denma Tsemang's arrival. Under this view, Denma Tsemang, a master of these classical scripts, popularized the existing script in Bumthang rather than inventing it independently.

Historically, Jogyig was used exclusively within Bhutan. While Bhutanese scholars and officials used the widely understood Tibetan Umed script for religious and trade correspondence with Tibet, internal communications were predominantly written in Jogyig. This included official edicts (kashog) issued by Zhabdrung Ngawang Namgyal and successive Druk Gyalpos, as well as administrative records and private correspondence. Historical examples of the script are preserved today in Bhutanese museums, libraries, and private collections.

== Letters ==
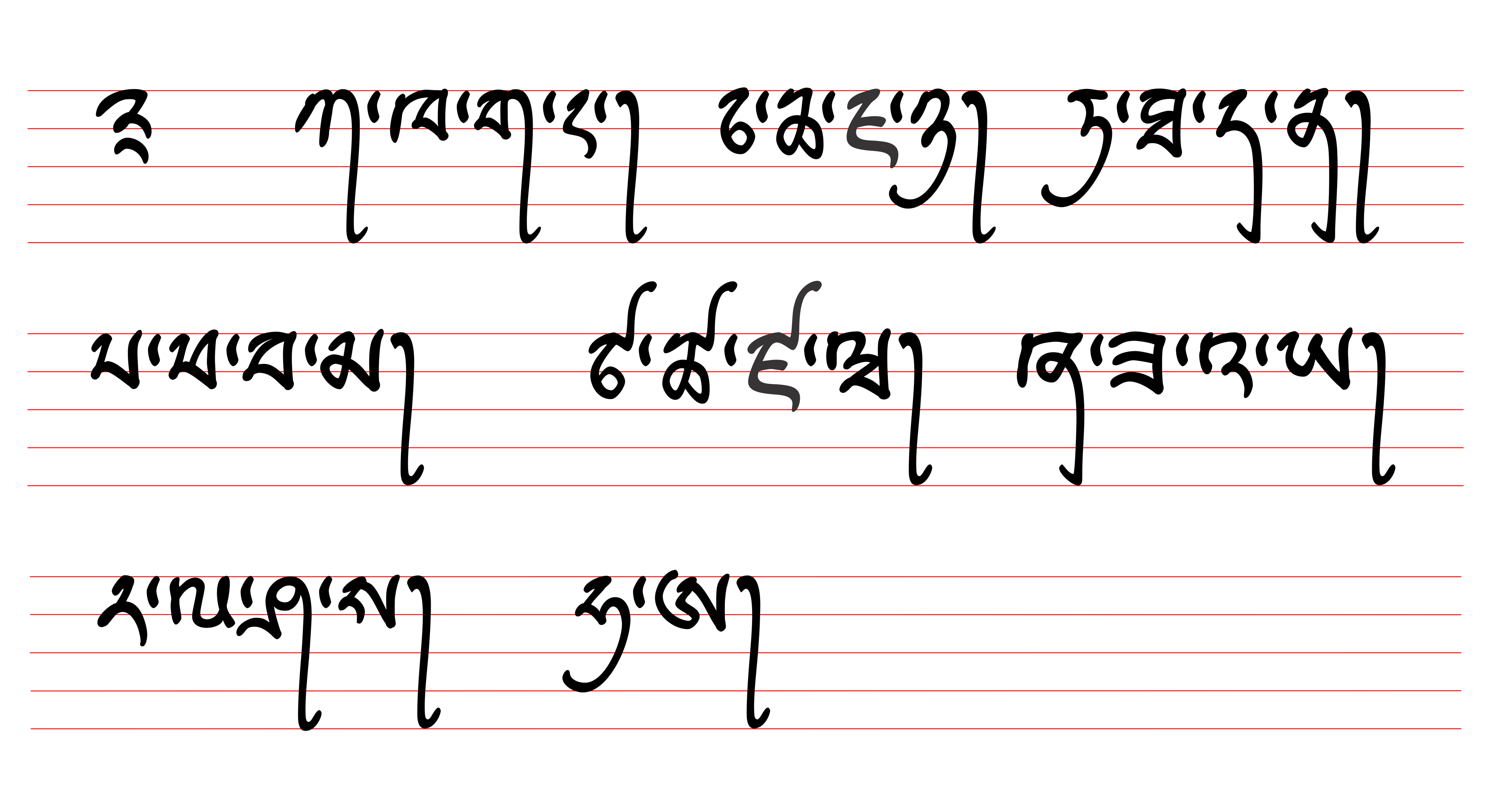
The 30 consonants of the Joyig script. Unlike the formal Jôtshum used for printing and religious texts, Jogyig incorporates looped connections and rounded forms that allow for greater speed.

"Dzongkha" written in Joyig script.

The Jogyig script is a Brahmic abugida system where syllables are written from left to right. Syllables are separated by a tsek (་) mark, which is a short vertical mark in Joyig; Spaces are not used to divide words, due to their segmental nature. It functions similarly to the Tibetan script due to being a cursive variation of the same. However, there are distinct differences between the Tibetan and Bhutanese ways of writing. The Dzongkha Development Commission noted that since 2000, while developing the Dzongkha Uchen font for the Unicode system, they identified 42 differences compared to the Tibetan script. The tsek can function slightly differently when setting margins, spacing, and word boundaries in Dzongkha text processing.

=== Basic Letters ===
Jogyig has 30 basic letters called གསལ་བྱེད། ((Wylie: gsal byed), or consonants. As in other Brahmic scripts, each consonant letter assumes an inherent vowel /a/ in Jogyig.

Jogyig Alphabet
	Unaspirated high		Aspirated medium		Voiced low		Nasal low	
	Letter	Tibetan Equivalent IPA	Letter	Tibetan Equivalent IPA	Letter	Tibetan Equivalent IPA	Letter	Tibetan Equivalent IPA
Guttural		ཀ /ka/		ཁ /kʰa/		ག (Note: These voiced values are historical. They have been devoiced in modern Standard Tibetan.) /ɡa/		ང /ŋa/
Palatal		ཅ /tʃa/		ཆ /tʃʰa/		ཇ /dʒa/		ཉ /ɲa/
Dental		ཏ /ta/		ཐ /tʰa/		ད /da/		ན /na/
Labial		པ /pa/		ཕ /pʰa/		བ /ba/		མ /ma/
Dental		ཙ /tsa/		ཚ /tsʰa/		ཛ /dza/		ཝ /wa/
low		ཞ /ʒa/		ཟ /za/		འ /ɦa/ ⟨ʼa⟩		ཡ /ja/
medium		ར /ra/		ལ /la/		ཤ /ʃa/		ས /sa/
high		ཧ /ha/		ཨ /a/ ⟨ꞏa⟩				

=== Vowels ===
There are five vowels in Jogyig, with the vowel carrier ཨ /a/ combined with diacritics to form the remaining four. Long and short vowels are not distinguished. Dzongkha is a tonal language, with tone predicted from the spelling patterns of the word's orthography instead of dedicated tone markers.

	Back open		Front close		Back close		Front mid		Back mid	
	Letter	Tibetan Equivalent IPA	Letter	Tibetan Equivalent IPA	Letter	Tibetan Equivalent IPA	Letter	Tibetan Equivalent IPA	Letter	Tibetan Equivalent IPA
Vowel		ཨ /a/		ཨི /i/		ཨུ /u/		ཨེ /e/		ཨོ /o/

== Policy and preservation ==
There is no special policy enshrining legal status for Jogyig in Bhutan. However, it is implicitly understood to be a part of Dzongkha, the national language. During the reigns of the Third and Fourth Druk Gyalpos, repeated royal edicts were issued emphasising the need to learn and preserve Dzongkha in order to properly understand Bhutan's religion, culture, traditions, and Driglam namzha (etiquette). Since the establishment of the National Assembly in 1953, numerous resolutions have been passed to preserve and promote Dzongkha and, in effect, the scripts of Bhutan.

=== Digitization ===
Since 2000, a project has successfully developed and distributed a computer font for Jogyig, which is now widely used within Bhutan. Schools have also been instructed to prioritize the teaching of Jogyig. During the annual book competitions organized by the DDC, extra points are awarded to books written in Jogyig to encourage its use.

=== Unicode ===
Being a stylistic variant of Tibetan, the script is mapped to Tibetan Unicode, with suitable fonts bringing the desired glyphs.

The Unicode block for Tibetan is U+0F00–U+0FFF. It includes letters, digits and various punctuation marks and special symbols used in religious texts:

Tibetan^{[1]}^{[2]}^{[3]} Official Unicode Consortium code chart (PDF)
	0	1	2	3	4	5	6	7	8	9	A	B	C	D	E	F
U+0F0x	ༀ	༁	༂	༃	༄	༅	༆	༇	༈	༉	༊	་	༌ NB	།	༎	༏
U+0F1x	༐	༑	༒	༓	༔	༕	༖	༗	༘	༙	༚	༛	༜	༝	༞	༟
U+0F2x	༠	༡	༢	༣	༤	༥	༦	༧	༨	༩	༪	༫	༬	༭	༮	༯
U+0F3x	༰	༱	༲	༳	༴	༵	༶	༷	༸	༹	༺	༻	༼	༽	༾	༿
U+0F4x	ཀ	ཁ	ག	གྷ	ང	ཅ	ཆ	ཇ		ཉ	ཊ	ཋ	ཌ	ཌྷ	ཎ	ཏ
U+0F5x	ཐ	ད	དྷ	ན	པ	ཕ	བ	བྷ	མ	ཙ	ཚ	ཛ	ཛྷ	ཝ	ཞ	ཟ
U+0F6x	འ	ཡ	ར	ལ	ཤ	ཥ	ས	ཧ	ཨ	ཀྵ	ཪ	ཫ	ཬ			
U+0F7x		ཱ	ི	ཱི	ུ	ཱུ	ྲྀ	ཷ	ླྀ	ཹ	ེ	ཻ	ོ	ཽ	ཾ	ཿ
U+0F8x	ྀ	ཱྀ	ྂ	ྃ	྄	྅	྆	྇	ྈ	ྉ	ྊ	ྋ	ྌ	ྍ	ྎ	ྏ
U+0F9x	ྐ	ྑ	ྒ	ྒྷ	ྔ	ྕ	ྖ	ྗ		ྙ	ྚ	ྛ	ྜ	ྜྷ	ྞ	ྟ
U+0FAx	ྠ	ྡ	ྡྷ	ྣ	ྤ	ྥ	ྦ	ྦྷ	ྨ	ྩ	ྪ	ྫ	ྫྷ	ྭ	ྮ	ྯ
U+0FBx	ྰ	ྱ	ྲ	ླ	ྴ	ྵ	ྶ	ྷ	ྸ	ྐྵ	ྺ	ྻ	ྼ		྾	྿
U+0FCx	࿀	࿁	࿂	࿃	࿄	࿅	࿆	࿇	࿈	࿉	࿊	࿋	࿌		࿎	࿏
U+0FDx	࿐	࿑	࿒	࿓	࿔	࿕	࿖	࿗	࿘	࿙	࿚					
U+0FEx																
U+0FFx																
Notes 1.As of Unicode version 18.0 2.Grey areas indicate non-assigned code points 3.Unicode code points U+0F77 and U+0F79 are deprecated in Unicode 5.2 and later

=== Dzongkha ===
Dzongkha keyboard layout

The Dzongkha keyboard layout scheme is designed as a simple means for inputting Dzongkha text on computers. This keyboard layout was standardized by the Dzongkha Development Commission (DDC) and the Department of Information Technology (DIT) of the Royal Government of Bhutan in 2000.

It was updated in 2009 to accommodate additional characters added to the Unicode and ISO 10646 standards since the initial version. Since the arrangement of keys essentially follows the usual order of the Dzongka and Tibetan alphabet, the layout can be quickly learned by anyone familiar with this alphabet. Subjoined (combining) consonants are entered using the Shift key.

The Dzongka keyboard layout is included in Microsoft Windows, Android, and most distributions of Linux as part of XFree86.

== Sample text ==
The following is a sample text in Dzongkha of Article 1 of the Universal Declaration of Human Rights:

=== In Joyig script ===
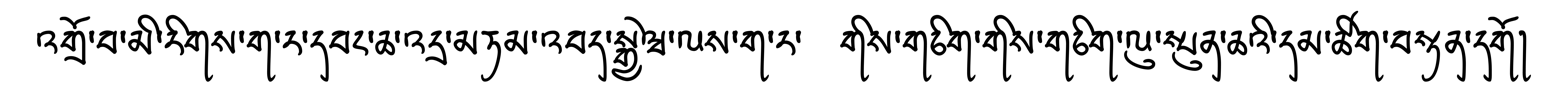

=== In Tibetan script ===
འགྲོ་བ་མི་རིགས་ག་ར་དབང་ཆ་འདྲ་མཏམ་འབད་སྒྱེཝ་ལས་ག་ར་ གིས་གཅིག་གིས་གཅིག་ལུ་སྤུན་ཆའི་དམ་ཚིག་བསྟན་དགོ།

=== Wylie transliteration & translation ===
འགྲོ་ བ་ མི་ རིགས་ ག་ ར་ དབང་ ཆ་ འདྲ་ མཏམ་ འབད་ སྒྱེཝ་ ལས་ ག་ ར་ གིས་ གཅིག་ ལུ་ སྤུན་ ཆའི་ དམ་ ཚིག་ བསྟན་ དགོ།
’Gro- ba- mi- rigs- ga- ra- dbaṅ- cha- ’dra- mtam- ’bad- sgyew- las- ga- ra- gis- gcig- lu- spun- cha’i- dam- tshig- bstan- dgo
All human beings are born free and equal in dignity and rights. They are endowed with reason and conscience and should act towards one another in a spirit of brotherhood.

== See also ==
- Dzongkha
- Roman Dzongkha
- Dzongkha Braille
- Dzongkha numerals
- Dzongkha keyboard layout
- Languages of Bhutan
- Culture of Bhutan
