= Ogawa integral =

In stochastic calculus, the Ogawa integral, also called the non-causal stochastic integral, is a stochastic integral for non-adapted processes as integrands. The corresponding calculus is called non-causal calculus which distinguishes it from the anticipating calculus of the Skorokhod integral. The term causality refers to the adaptation to the natural filtration of the integrator.

The integral was introduced by the Japanese mathematician Shigeyoshi Ogawa in 1979.

== Ogawa integral ==
Let

- $(\Omega,\mathcal{F},P)$ be a probability space,
- $W=(W_t)_{t\in[0,T]}$ be a one-dimensional standard Wiener process with $T\in\mathbb{R}_+$,
- $\mathcal{F}_t^W=\sigma(W_s;0\leq s \leq t)\subset \mathcal{F}$ and $\mathbf{F}^W=\{\mathcal{F}_t^W, t\geq 0\}$ be the natural filtration of the Wiener process,
- $\mathcal{B}([0,T])$ the Borel σ-algebra,
- $\int f\; dW_t$ be the Wiener integral,
- $dt$ be the Lebesgue measure.

Further let $\mathbf{H}$ be the set of real-valued processes $X\colon [0,T]\times \Omega \to\mathbb{R}$ that are $\mathcal{B}([0,T])\times \mathcal{F}$-measurable and almost surely in $L^2([0,T],dt)$, i.e.

$$P\left(\int_0^T |X(t,\omega)|^2 \, dt< \infty\right)=1.$$

=== Ogawa integral ===
Let $\{\varphi_n\}_{n\in \mathbb{N}}$ be a complete orthonormal basis of the Hilbert space $L^2([0,T],dt)$.

A process $X\in\mathbf{H}$ is called $\varphi$-integrable if the random series

$$\int_0^T X_t \, d_\varphi W_t:=\sum_{n=1}^\infty \left(\int_0^T X_t \varphi_n(t) \, dt\right) \int_0^T\varphi_n(t) \, dW_t$$

converges in probability and the corresponding sum is called the Ogawa integral with respect to the basis $\{\varphi_n\}$.

If $X$ is $\varphi$-integrable for any complete orthonormal basis of $L^2([0,T],dt)$ and the corresponding integrals share the same value then $X$ is called universal Ogawa integrable (or u-integrable).

More generally, the Ogawa integral can be defined for any $L^2(\Omega,P)$-process $Z_t$ (such as the fractional Brownian motion) as integrators

$$\int_0^T X_t \, d_\varphi Z_t:=\sum_{n=1}^\infty \left(\int_0^T X_t \varphi_n(t) \, dt\right) \int_0^T\varphi_n(t) \, dZ_t$$

as long as the integrals

$$\int_0^T\varphi_n(t) \, dZ_t$$

are well-defined.

==== Remarks ====
- The convergence of the series depends not only on the orthonormal basis but also on the ordering of that basis.
- There exist various equivalent definitions for the Ogawa integral which can be found in. One way makes use of the Itô–Nisio theorem.

==== Regularity of the orthonormal basis ====
An important concept for the Ogawa integral is the regularity of an orthonormal basis. An orthonormal basis $\{\varphi_n\}_{n\in \mathbb{N}}$ is called regular if

$$\sup_n \int_0^T \left( \sum_{i=1}^n \varphi_i(t)\int_0^t \varphi_i(s) \, ds\right)^2 \, dt<\infty$$

holds.

The following results on regularity are known:

- Every semimartingale (causal or not) is $\varphi$-integrable if and only if $\{\varphi_n\}$ is regular.
- It was proven that there exist a non-regular basis for $L^2([0,1], dt)$.

== Further topics ==
- There exist a non-causal Itô formula, a non-causal integration by parts formula and a non-causal Girsanov theorem.

=== Relationship to other integrals ===
- Stratonovich integral: let $X$ be a continuous $\mathbf{F}^W$-adapted semimartingale that is universal Ogawa integrable with respect to the Wiener process, then the Stratonovich integral exist and coincides with the Ogawa integral.
- Skorokhod integral: the relationship between the Ogawa integral and the Skorokhod integral was studied in.

== Literature ==
- Ogawa, Shigeyoshi (2017). Noncausal Stochastic Calculus. Tokyo: Springer. doi:10.1007/978-4-431-56576-5. ISBN 978-4-431-56574-1.
