= Tibetan Braille =

Braille alphabet for the Tibetan language

- Script type: Alphabet (non-linear)
- Creator: Sabriye Tenberken
- Period: 1992
- Print basis: Tibetan alphabet
- Languages: Tibetan

Related scripts
- Parent systems: Night writing: Braille; German Braille; Tibetan Braille

Tibetan Braille is the Braille alphabet for writing the Tibetan language. It was invented in 1992 by German social worker Sabriye Tenberken. It is based on German braille, with some extensions from international usage. As in print, the vowel a is not written.

Despite Tibetan and Dzongkha (Bhutanese) using the same alphabet in print, Tibetan Braille differs significantly from Dzongkha Braille, which tends to assign patterns more based on the romanisation.

== Alphabet ==
Tibetan Braille follows print orthography. (See Tibetan script.) This is often a poor match for how words are pronounced. Each syllable is rendered in the following order:

pre-consonant, superscript consonant, head consonant, subscript consonant, vowel, post-consonant(s)

The invariable consonants are:

Consonant	ka	kha	ga	nga	ca	cha	ja	nya
Print	ཀ	ཁ	ག	ང	ཅ	ཆ	ཇ	ཉ
Braille	⠅ (braille pattern dots-13)	⠉ (braille pattern dots-14)	⠛ (braille pattern dots-1245)	⠶ (braille pattern dots-2356)	⠹ (braille pattern dots-1456)	⠽ (braille pattern dots-13456)	⠟ (braille pattern dots-12345)	⠜ (braille pattern dots-345)

Consonant	ta	tha	da	na	pa	pha	ba	ma
Print	ཏ	ཐ	ད	ན	པ	ཕ	བ	མ
Braille	⠞ (braille pattern dots-2345)	⠾ (braille pattern dots-23456)	⠙ (braille pattern dots-145)	⠝ (braille pattern dots-1345)	⠏ (braille pattern dots-1234)	⠯ (braille pattern dots-12346)	⠃ (braille pattern dots-12)	⠍ (braille pattern dots-134)

Consonant	tsa	tsha	dza	zha	za	'a	sha	ha
Print	ཙ	ཚ	ཛ	ཞ	ཟ	འ	ཤ	ཧ
Braille	⠭ (braille pattern dots-1346)	⠵ (braille pattern dots-1356)	⠿ (braille pattern dots-123456)	⠩ (braille pattern dots-146)	⠎ (braille pattern dots-234)	⠫ (braille pattern dots-1246)	⠱ (braille pattern dots-156)	⠓ (braille pattern dots-125)

Several consonants, wa, ya, ra, la, and sa, are provided with forms corresponding to the superscript and subscript positions in print:

Consonant		wa	ya	ra	la	sa
Print		ཝ	ཡ	ར	ལ	ས
Braille	as base letter	⠺ (braille pattern dots-2456)	⠚ (braille pattern dots-245)	⠗ (braille pattern dots-1235)	⠇ (braille pattern dots-123)	⠮ (braille pattern dots-2346)
Braille	as superscript	–	–	⠘ (braille pattern dots-45)		⠦ (braille pattern dots-236)
Braille	as subscript	⠲ (braille pattern dots-256)	⠴ (braille pattern dots-356)	⠖ (braille pattern dots-235)	⠧ (braille pattern dots-1236)	–

Several of the assignments do not match the assignment suggested by their Wylie transliteration, but are instead chosen to match letters with similar sounds in the German Braille: ⠹ ch for c, ⠚ j for y [j], ⠵ z [ts] for tsh, ⠎ s [z] for z, ⠱ sch [ʃ] for sh, ⠮ ß [s] for s. Letters which are not basic to the German alphabet (c, q, x, y) have been reassigned. Several of the aspirated consonants (ch, th, ph) are equivalent to the corresponding unaspirated consonant with an extra dot in the third row. The assignments for zh and z matches the assignment often given to sh and s, since those letters are pronounced like English sh [ʃ] and s [s].

The short vowel "a" is inherent in the head (main) consonant, and is not written explicitly. When a vowel occurs at the beginning of a word, it is carried by a null consonant ཨ ⟨⠁⟩:

Vowels	a	i	u	e	o
Print (on ཨ )	ཨ	ཨི	ཨུ	ཨེ	ཨོ
Braille	⠁ (braille pattern dots-1)	⠁ (braille pattern dots-1) ⠊ (braille pattern dots-24)	⠁ (braille pattern dots-1) ⠥ (braille pattern dots-136)	⠁ (braille pattern dots-1) ⠑ (braille pattern dots-15)	⠁ (braille pattern dots-1) ⠕ (braille pattern dots-135)

== Numbers and punctuation ==
Digits are as in English Braille. Basic punctuation:

Print	,	;	.
Braille	⠂ (braille pattern dots-2)	⠆ (braille pattern dots-23)	⠆ (braille pattern dots-23)
