= Junko Itō =

American linguist (born 1954)

Junko Itō (伊藤 順子, Itō Junko; born 1954) is a Japanese-born American linguist. She is emerita research professor of linguistics at the University of California, Santa Cruz.

She is the daughter of mathematician Kiyosi Itô.

== Education and research ==
Itō received her PhD ln Linguistics in 1986 from the University of Massachusetts Amherst under the supervision of Alan Prince. She joined the faculty of the University of California, Santa Cruz, in 1987 and remained there until her retirement in 2021. She served as chair of the department from 1999–2006.

Itō's research focuses on phonology and morphology. She is primarily known for her work on syllable structure within an optimality theoretic framework. Her influential work has addressed a number of issues in the phonology of the Japanese language, including the rendaku phenomenon. Her work has been published in Linguistic Inquiry amongst other peer-reviewed research journals in linguistics.

Itō often collaborated with her UCSC colleague and husband Armin Mester. From 2018 to 2020, they led an NSF grant investigating Syntax-Prosody in Optimality Theory.

== Honors ==
From 2007 to 2012, Itō was a co-editor of Natural Language and Linguistic Theory.

A Festschrift in the honor of Junko Itō & Armin Mester, Hana-bana, was published by UC Santa Cruz in 2018.

== Selected publications ==
2015 Ito, Junko, and Armin Mester. Sino-Japanese Phonology. Chapter 7 of Handbook of Japanese Phonetics and Phonology. ed. by H. Kubozono. pp. 289–312.

2015 Ito, Junko, and Armin Mester. Word Formation and Phonological Processes. Chapter 9 of Handbook of Japanese Phonetics and Phonology. ed. by H. Kubozono. pp. 363–395.

2012 Ito, Junko, and Armin Mester. Recursive prosodic phrasing in Japanese. In: Borowsky, Toni, Shigeto Kawahara, Mariko Sugahara, and Takahito Shinya, eds. 2012. Prosody Matters. Essays in Honor of Elisabeth Selkirk. Advances in Optimality Theory Series. Elsevier. 280-303.

2009 Ito, Junko, and Armin Mester. The extended prosodic word. In Kabak, Baris, and Janet Grijzenhout, eds. Phonological Domains: Universals and Derivations. The Hague, The Netherlands: Mouton de Gruyter. 135-194.

2009 Ito, Junko, and Armin Mester. Lexical classes in phonology. In Miyagawa, Shigeru, and Mamoru Saito, eds. Handbook of Japanese Linguistics. Oxford: Oxford University Press. 84-106.

2003 Ito, Junko, and Armin Mester. Japanese Morphophonemics: Markedness and Word Structure. MIT Press Linguistic Inquiry Monograph Series 41. Cambridge, Mass.

2003 Ito, Junko, and Armin Mester. Weak Layering and Word Binarity. In Honma, Takeru, Masao Okazaki, Toshiyuki Tabata and Shin-ichi Tanaka, eds. A New Century of Phonology and Phonological Theory. A Festschrift for Professor Shosuke Haraguchi on the Occasion of His Sixtieth Birthday. 26-65.

1999 Ito, Junko, and Armin Mester. The structure of the phonological lexicon. In Tsujimura, Natsuko, ed. The Handbook of Japanese Linguistics. Malden, MA, and Oxford, U.K.: Blackwell Publishers. 62-100.

1999 Ito, Junko, and Armin Mester. Realignment. In R. Kager, H. v.d. Hulst, and W.Zonneveld, eds. The Prosody-Morphology Interface. Cambridge: Cambridge University Press. 188-217.

1997 Ito, Junko, and Armin Mester. Sympathy Theory and German truncations. In Miglio, Viola, and Bruce Morén, eds., University of Maryland Working Papers in Linguistics, Vol. 5. Selected phonology papers from Hopkins Optimality Theory Workshop 1997/University of Maryland Mayfest 1997. 117-139. Also in: On'in kenkyuu [Phonological Studies], ed. by the Phonological Society of Japan. Kaitakusha, Tokyo. 1998. 51-66.

1996 Ito, Junko, and Armin Mester. Stem and word in Sino-Japanese. In Otake, Takashi, and Ann Cutler, eds. Phonological Structure and Language Processing: Cross-Linguistic Studies, Speech Research Series. Vol. 12. Berlin: Mouton de Gruyter.13-44.

1995 Ito, Junko, Armin Mester, and Jaye Padgett. Licensing and redundancy: underspecification in Optimality Theory. Linguistic Inquiry 26. 571-614.

1995 Ito, Junko, and Armin Mester. Japanese phonology. In Goldsmith, John, ed., The Handbook of Phonological Theory. Blackwell. 817-838.

1993 Ito, Junko, and Armin Mester. Licensed segments and safe paths. Canadian Journal of Linguistics 38. 197-213.

1990 Ito, Junko. Prosodic Minimality in Japanese, CLS 26-II: Papers from the Parasession on the Syllable in Phonetics and Phonology, 213-239.

1989 Ito, Junko. A Prosodic Theory of Epenthesis, Natural Language and Linguistics Theory 7, 217-260.

1988 Ito, Junko. Syllable Theory in Prosodic Phonology, Garland Publishing, New York.
