= Petseling Monastery =

Monastery near Jakar, Bhutan

Coordinates: 27.5806°N 90.7750°E

Petseling Monastery (Tibetan: པད་ཚལ་གླིང, THL: Padtselling) is a Buddhist monastery (gompa) located near Jakar in the Bumthang District of Bhutan. The monastery was established in 1769 (257 years ago) under the patronage of the Penlop of Trongsa and the dzongpen (governor) of Jakar. It is built in the traditional dzong style and serves as an important center for the Nyingma school of Tibetan Buddhism.

== History ==
According to Bhutanese historical sources, Petseling Monastery was founded by the spiritual master Drupthop Namgyal Lhundup (also known as the First Petseling Trulku). Before establishing the monastery, he is said to have travelled to Lhasa, where he made offerings before the statue of Jowo Rinpoche at the Jokhang temple. During his stay, he reportedly received a spiritual instruction or prophecy directing him to return to Bhutan and establish a monastic seat east of Kurje Lhakhang in Bumthang.

Following this vision, Namgyal Lhundup founded the monastery on a ridge surrounded by forests and natural springs. The location, noted for its abundance of wildflowers and medicinal plants, was chosen for its serene environment conducive to meditation and monastic study.
