= Skorokhod integral =

Mathematical operator

In mathematics, the Skorokhod integral, also named Hitsuda–Skorokhod integral, often denoted $\delta$, is an operator of great importance in the theory of stochastic processes. It is named after the Ukrainian mathematician Anatoliy Skorokhod and Japanese mathematician Masuyuki Hitsuda. Part of its importance is that it unifies several concepts:

- $\delta$ is an extension of the Itô integral to non-adapted processes;
- $\delta$ is the adjoint of the Malliavin derivative, which is fundamental to the stochastic calculus of variations (Malliavin calculus);
- $\delta$ is an infinite-dimensional generalization of the divergence operator from classical vector calculus.

The integral was introduced by Hitsuda in 1972 and by Skorokhod in 1975.

== Definition ==
=== Preliminaries: the Malliavin derivative ===
Consider a fixed probability space $(\Omega, \Sigma, \mathbf{P})$ and a Hilbert space $H$; $\mathbf{E}$ denotes expectation with respect to $\mathbf{P}$

$$\mathbf{E} [X] := \int_\Omega X(\omega) \, \mathrm{d} \mathbf{P}(\omega).$$

Intuitively speaking, the Malliavin derivative of a random variable $F$ in $L^p(\Omega)$ is defined by expanding it in terms of Gaussian random variables that are parametrized by the elements of $H$ and differentiating the expansion formally; the Skorokhod integral is the adjoint operation to the Malliavin derivative.

Consider a family of $\mathbb{R}$-valued random variables $W(h)$, indexed by the elements $h$ of the Hilbert space $H$. Assume further that each $W(h)$ is a Gaussian (normal) random variable, that the map taking $h$ to $W(h)$ is a linear map, and that the mean and covariance structure is given by

$$\mathbf{E} [W(h)] = 0,$$
$$\mathbf{E} [W(g) W(h)] = \langle g, h \rangle_H,$$

for all $g$ and $h$ in $H$. It can be shown that, given $H$, there always exists a probability space $(\Omega, \Sigma, \mathbf{P})$ and a family of random variables with the above properties. The Malliavin derivative is essentially defined by formally setting the derivative of the random variable $W(h)$ to be $h$, and then extending this definition to "smooth enough" random variables. For a random variable $F$ of the form

$$F = f(W(h_1), \ldots, W(h_n)),$$

where $f : \mathbb{R}^n \to \mathbb{R}$ is smooth, the Malliavin derivative is defined using the earlier "formal definition" and the chain rule:

$$\mathrm{D} F := \sum_{i = 1}^n \frac{\partial f}{\partial x_i} (W(h_1), \ldots, W(h_n)) h_i.$$

In other words, whereas $F$ was a real-valued random variable, its derivative $\mathrm{D}F$ is an $H$-valued random variable, an element of the space $L^p(\Omega; H)$. Of course, this procedure only defines $\mathrm{D}F$ for "smooth" random variables, but an approximation procedure can be employed to define $\mathrm{D}F$ for $F$ in a large subspace of $L^p(\Omega)$; the domain of $\mathrm{D}$ is the closure of the smooth random variables in the seminorm :

$$\| F \|_{1, p} := \big( \mathbf{E}[|F|^p] + \mathbf{E}[\| \mathrm{D}F \|_H^p] \big)^{1/p}.$$

This space is denoted by $\mathbf{D}^{1, p}$ and is called the Watanabe–Sobolev space.

=== The Skorokhod integral ===
For simplicity, consider now just the case $p = 2$. The Skorokhod integral $\delta$ is defined to be the $L^2$-adjoint of the Malliavin derivative $\mathrm{D}$. Just as $\mathrm{D}$ was not defined on the whole of $L^2(\Omega)$, $\delta$ is not defined on the whole of $L^2(\Omega; H)$: the domain of $\delta$ consists of those processes $u$ in $L^2(\Omega; H)$ for which there exists a constant $C(u)$ such that, for all $F$ in $\mathbf{D}^{1, 2}$,

$$\big| \mathbf{E} [ \langle \mathrm{D} F, u \rangle_{H} ] \big| \leq C(u) \| F \|_{L^{2} (\Omega)}.$$

The Skorokhod integral of a process $u$ in $L^2(\Omega; H)$ is a real-valued random variable $\delta u$ in $L^2(\Omega)$; if $u$ lies in the domain of $\delta$, then $\delta u$ is defined by the relation that, for all $F \in \mathbf{D}^{1, 2}$,

$$\mathbf{E} [F \, \delta u] = \mathbf{E} [ \langle \mathrm{D}F, u \rangle_{H} ].$$

Just as the Malliavin derivative $\mathrm{D}$ was first defined on simple, smooth random variables, the Skorokhod integral has a simple expression for "simple processes": if $u$ is given by

$$u = \sum_{j = 1}^{n} F_{j} h_{j}$$

with $F_j$ smooth and $h_j$ in $H$, then

$$\delta u = \sum_{j = 1}^{n} \left( F_{j} W(h_{j}) - \langle \mathrm{D} F_{j}, h_{j} \rangle_{H} \right).$$

== Properties ==
- The isometry property: for any process $u$ in $\mathbf{D}^{1, p}$ that lies in the domain of $\delta$,
  $$\mathbf{E} \big[ (\delta u)^{2} \big] = \mathbf{E} \int | u_t |^{2} dt + \mathbf{E} \int D_s u_t\, D_t u_s\,ds\, dt.$$
  If $u$ is an adapted process, then $D_s u_t = 0$ for $s > t$, so the second term on the right-hand side vanishes. The Skorokhod and Itô integrals coincide in that case, and the above equation becomes the Itô isometry.
- The derivative of a Skorokhod integral is given by the formula
  $$\mathrm{D}_{h} (\delta u) = \langle u, h \rangle_{H} + \delta (\mathrm{D}_{h} u),$$
  where $\mathrm{D}_h X$ stands for $(\mathrm{D}X)(h)$, the random variable that is the value of the process $\mathrm{D} X$ at "time" $h$ in $H$.
- The Skorokhod integral of the product of a random variable $F$ in $\mathbf{D}^{1, 2}$ and a process $u$ in $\operatorname{dom}(\delta)$ is given by the formula
  $$\delta (F u) = F \, \delta u - \langle \mathrm{D} F, u \rangle_{H}.$$

== Alternatives ==
An alternative to the Skorokhod integral is the Ogawa integral.
