= German Braille =

Braille alphabet of the German language

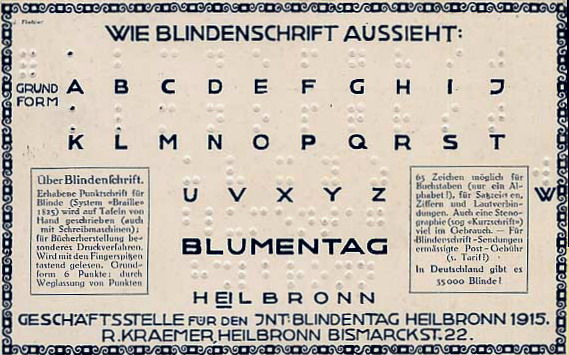
- Script type: Alphabet (non-linear)
- Period: ca. 1878
- Print basis: German alphabet
- Languages: German

Related scripts
- Parent systems: night writing: braille; German Braille
- Child systems: Tibetan Braille

Unicode
- Unicode range: U+2800 to U+283F

German Braille is one of the older braille alphabets. The French-based order of the letter assignments was largely settled on with the 1878 convention that decided the standard for international braille. However, the assignments for German letters beyond the 26 of the basic Latin alphabet are mostly unrelated to French values.

== Letters ==
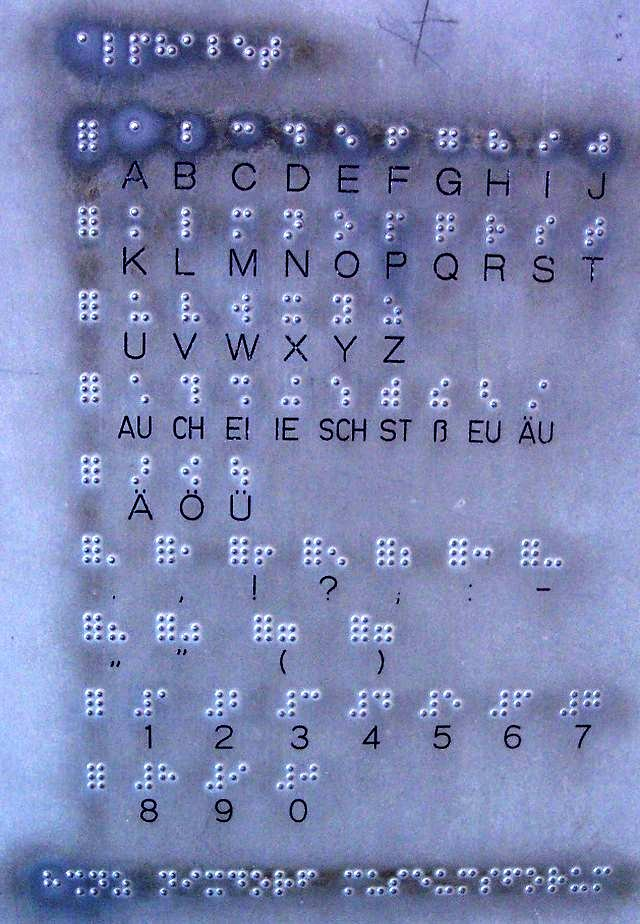
A German Braille index at the Nixdorfmuseum

In numerical order by decade, the letters are:

a	b	c en	d	e	f	g	h	i	j
k	l	m	n	o	p	q ll	r	s	t
u	v	x mm	y el	z	& ge	% es	em	ß ss	st
au	eu	ei	ch	sch	ein	er	ü	ö	w
⠂ (braille pattern dots-2)	be	al	un	or	an	eh	tt	in	ar
-ig	äu	ä	ie	# ich	$ ck	-lich	-ach		

The generic accent sign, ⠈, is used with foreign names such as ⠍⠕⠇⠊⠈⠑⠗⠑ Molière that have accented letters not found in German. There are numerous contractions and abbreviations.

== Punctuation ==
Punctuation is as follows:

. (Note: And thus the ellipsis, ⠄⠄⠄ (...).)	,	’	;	:	?	!	-	—	/	|	\	*	_

Only the first asterisk is marked with dot 6, so print *** is in braille ⠠⠔⠔⠔.

§	Art.	&	@	°	′	″

⠴ is the Artikel sign, marking an article of a document.

... „ ... “	... ‘ ... ’	... ( ... )	... [ ... ]

For the brackets of phonetic transcription, German Braille uses a modified form, ⠰⠶...⠰⠶.

Additional punctuation and symbols, especially mathematical, are explained in the external reference below.

== Numbers ==
Numbers are introduced with the sign ⠼. They are dropped to decade 5 for ordinals and for the denominator of fractions.

So, for example, ⠼⠙ is ⟨4⟩, while ⠼⠲ is ⟨4.⟩ (4th), and ⠼⠉⠲ is ⟨3/4⟩́.

(num.)	%	‰

The percent sign requires the number sign even after a number: ⠼⠃⠼⠴ ⟨2%⟩; otherwise it would look like the (undefined) fraction 2/0.

In a compound fraction, a repeat of the number sign separate the units from the fraction: ⠼⠁⠼⠁⠆ ⟨1 1/2⟩.

== Formatting ==
(num.)	(Caps)	(CAPS)	(ALL CAPS)	(l.c.)	(emphasis)	(end)

The emphasis sign (for italics, underline, or bold) is marked with an extra point, ⠠⠸, when it occurs in the middle of a word. It is doubled, ⠸⠸, when more than one word is emphasized, in which case the ending sign ⠠⠄ will be required at the end of the last word.

The all-caps sign is used for initialisms and the like. Doubled, it is used for all-cap text, such as titles, and the same ending sign, ⠠⠄, is used. Names with initials, such as J.S. Bach, do not require the cap sign. The lower-case sign ⠠ is used to mark mixed case or exceptions to expected capitalization; as such, it replaces the apostrophe that sets off the plural -s in print:

⠘⠊⠉⠠⠎ ⟨IC's⟩, ⠘⠍⠨⠓⠵ ⟨MHz⟩, ⠨⠛⠍⠃⠘⠓ ⟨GmbH⟩.

(Note the initialism sign can be used for a single letter.)

Lower-case metric units are marked as lower-case: ⠠⠅⠘⠺ ⟨kW⟩. This is useful, as it ends the scope of the number sign ⠼:

⠼⠁⠉⠚⠠⠓⠨⠏⠁ ⟨130 hPa⟩, ⠼⠁⠉⠚⠠⠅⠘⠧⠁ ⟨130 kVA⟩.

== See also ==
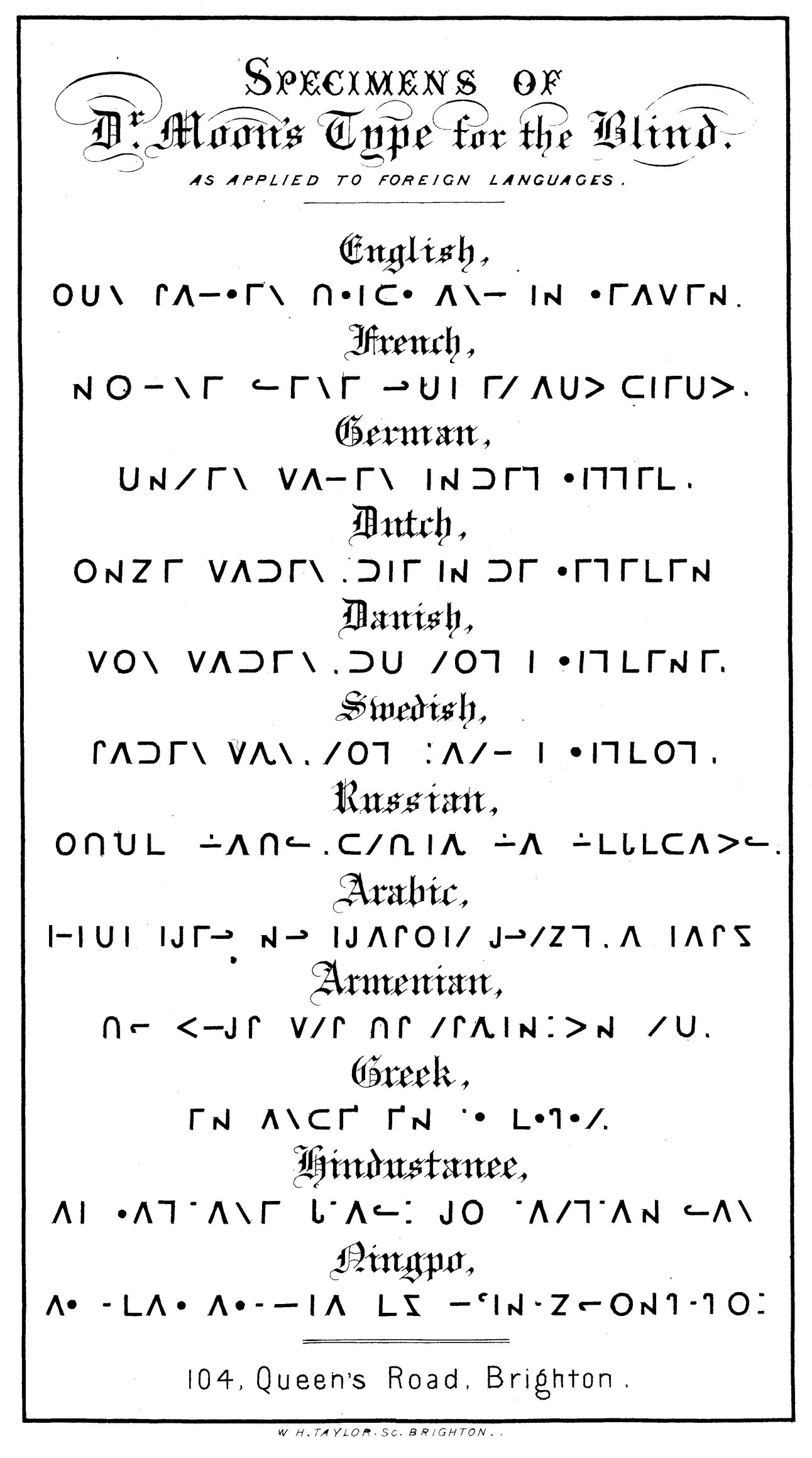
A sample of Moon type in various languages including German

- Moon type is a simplification of the Latin alphabet for embossing. An adaptation for German-reading blind people has been proposed.
