= Dzongkha keyboard layout =

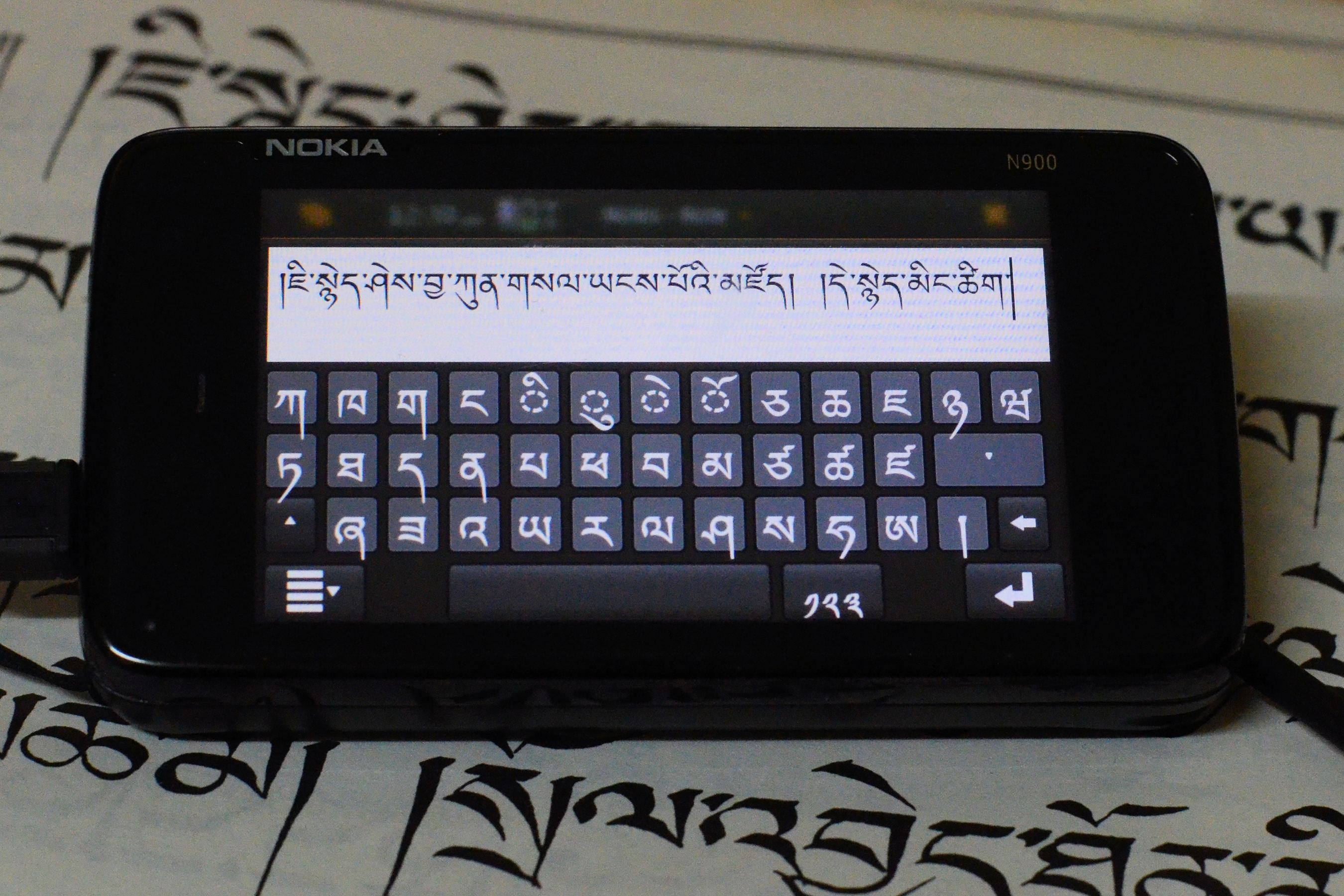
Virtual Dzongkha keyboard layout on a smart phone

The Dzongkha keyboard layout scheme is designed as a simple means for inputting Dzongkha (རྫོང་ཁ) and classical Tibetan (ཆོས་སྐད) text on computers. This keyboard layout was standardized by the Dzongkha Development Commission (DDC) and the Department of Information Technology and Telecom (DITT) of the Royal Government of Bhutan in 2000. It was updated in 2009 to accommodate additional characters added to the Unicode & ISO 10646 standards since the initial version.

Since the arrangement of keys essentially follows the usual order of the Dzongkha and Tibetan alphabet, the layout can be quickly learned by anyone familiar with this alphabet. Subjoined (combining) consonants are entered using the Shift key.

The Dzongkha (dz) keyboard layout is included in the XFree86 distribution.

== Keyboard layout ==
Dzongkha (Bhutan) - dz-BT

== Alternative Dzongkha input ==
- Dzongkha Keyboard & Input Methods - National Library of Bhutan
- Dzongkha Typing Tutor
- Dzongkha Keyboard map -THDL
- Dzongkha Unicode Keyboard for Windows - THDL
- Dzongkha Keyboard for Mac OS X
- Dzongkha Computing Instructions - Dzongkha Development Commission, Bhutan
