= Dzongkha =

Sino-Tibetan language spoken in Bhutan

- Bhutanese; Bhutanese Tibetan
- རྫོང་ཁ་
- "Dzongkha" written in the Joyig script (top) and the Uchen script (bottom)
- Pronunciation: [d͡zòŋkʰɑ́]
- Native to: Bhutan
- Ethnicity: Ngalop people
- Native speakers: 171,080 (2013); Total speakers: 640,000
- Language family: Sino-Tibetan: Tibeto-Burman; Tibeto-Kanauri (?); Bodish; Tibetic; Dzongkha–Lhokä; Dzongkha
- Early forms: Proto-Sino-Tibetan: Old Tibetan; Classical Tibetan
- Dialects: Laya; Lunana; Adap
- Writing system: Joyig script; Tibetan script; Dzongkha Braille

Official status
- Official language in: Bhutan
- Regulated by: Dzongkha Development Commission

Language codes
- ISO 639-1: dz
- ISO 639-2: dzo
- ISO 639-3: dzo
- Glottolog: nucl1307
- Linguasphere: 70-AAA-bf
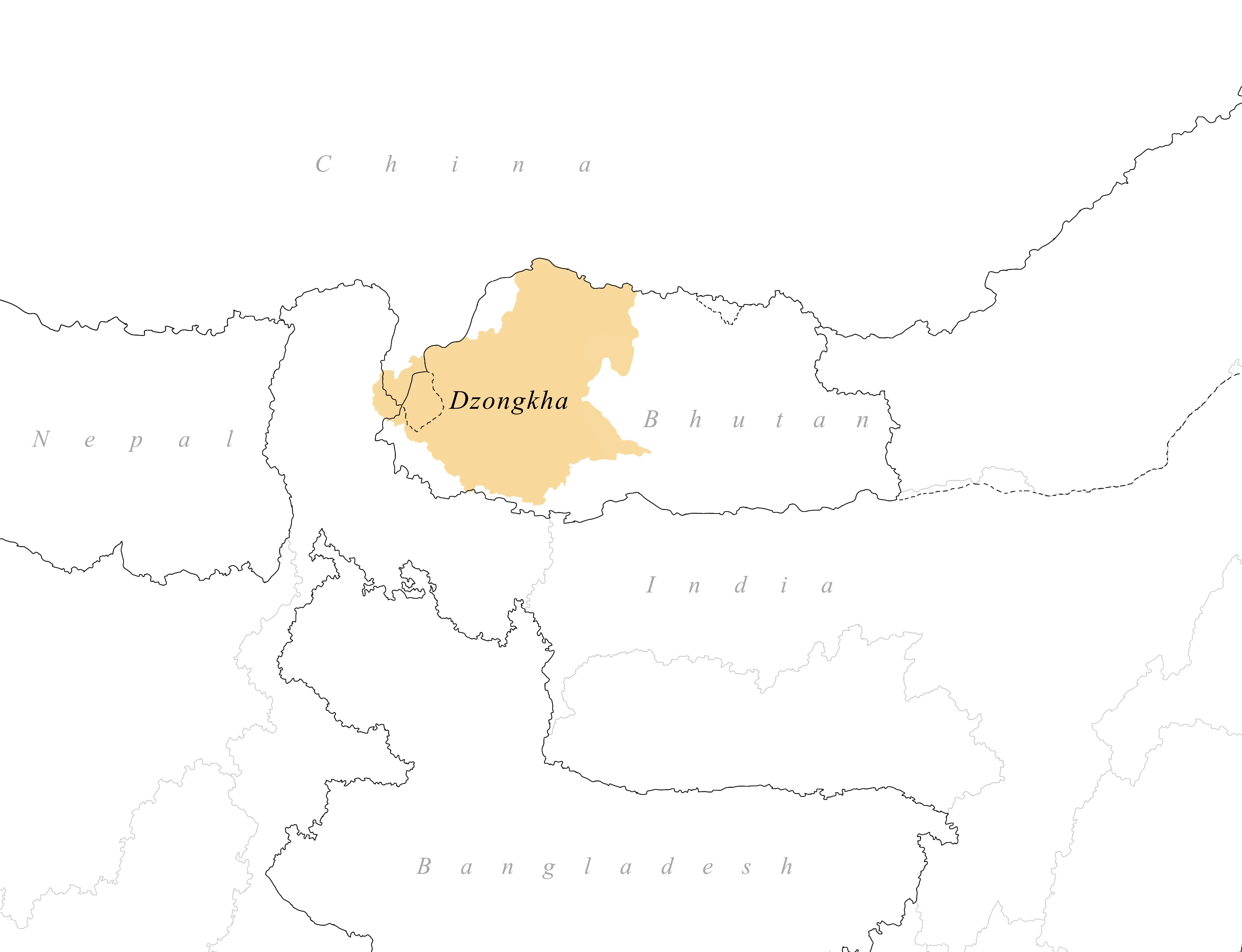
- Map of where the Dzongkha language is spoken natively

Kinley speaking Dzongkha (Wikitongues)

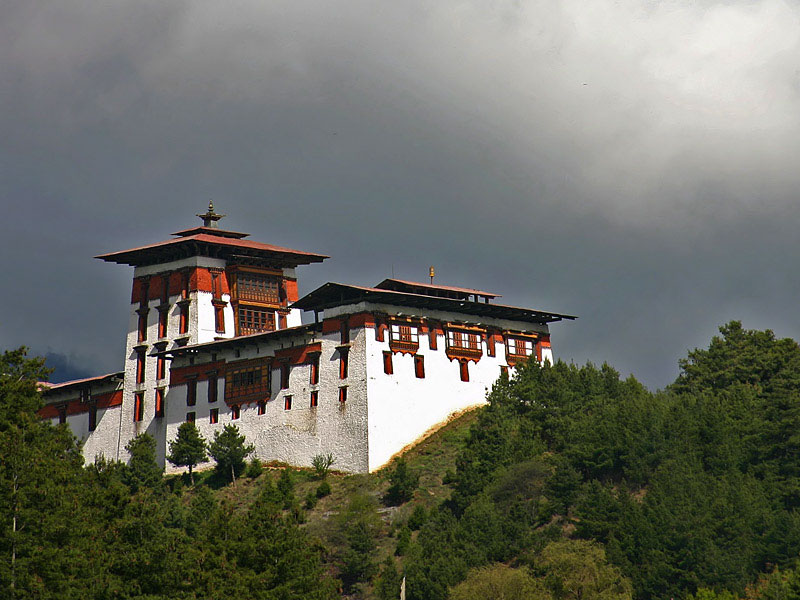
Jakar Dzong, representative of the distinct dzong architecture from which Dzongkha gets its name

Dzongkha (Note: /ˈzɒŋ.kə/ ZONG-kə or /ˈdzɒŋ.kə/) (རྫོང་ཁ་ [d͡zòŋkʰɑ́]), also known by its exonym Bhutanese, is a Tibetic language spoken primarily by the Bhutanese people. It is the official and national language of Bhutan, and is written using the Tibetan script in formal contexts, with informal correspondence in the Joyig script.

The word dzongkha means "the language of the fortress", from dzong "fortress" and kha "language". As of 2013, Dzongkha had 171,080 native speakers and about 640,000 total speakers.

Dzongkha is a South Tibetic language. It is closely related to Laya and Lunana and partially intelligible with Sikkimese, and to some other Bhutanese languages such as Chochangachakha, Brokpa, Brokkat and Lakha. It has a more distant relationship to Standard Tibetan.

== Classification ==
Dzongkha is considered a South Tibetic language. It is closely related to and partially intelligible with Sikkimese, and to some other Bhutanese languages such as Chochangachakha, Brokpa, Brokkat and Lakha.

Dzongkha bears a close linguistic relationship to J'umowa, which is spoken in the Chumbi Valley of Southern Tibet. It has a much more distant relationship to Standard Tibetan. Spoken Dzongkha and Tibetan are around 50% to 80% mutually intelligible, with the literary forms of both highly influenced by the liturgical (clerical) Classical Tibetan language, known in Bhutan as Chöke (ཆོས་སྐད།), which has been used for centuries by Buddhist monks. Chöke was used as the language of education in Bhutan until the early 1960s when it was replaced by Dzongkha in public schools.

Although descended from Classical Tibetan, Dzongkha shows a great many irregularities in sound changes that make the official spelling and standard pronunciation more distant from each other than is the case with Standard Tibetan. It has been written that "traditional orthography and modern phonology are two distinct systems operating by a distinct set of rules" in Dzongkha.

== Usage ==
Dzongkha and its dialects are the native tongue of eight western districts of Bhutan (viz. Wangdue Phodrang, Punakha, Thimphu, Gasa, Paro, Ha, Dagana and Chukha). There are also some native speakers near the Indian town of Kalimpong, once part of Bhutan but now in North Bengal, and in Sikkim.

Dzongkha was declared the national language of Bhutan in 1971. Dzongkha study is mandatory in all schools, and the language is the lingua franca in the districts to the south and east where it is not the mother tongue. The Bhutanese films Travellers and Magicians (2003) and Lunana: A Yak in the Classroom (2019) are in Dzongkha.

== Phonology ==
=== Tones ===
Dzongkha is a tonal language and has two register tones: high and low. The tone of a syllable determines the allophone of the onset and the phonation type of the nuclear vowel.

=== Consonants ===
Consonant phonemes
		Bilabial	Dental/ Alveolar		Retroflex	(Alveolo-) Palatal	Velar	Glottal
		Bilabial	plain	sibilant	Retroflex	(Alveolo-) Palatal	Velar	Glottal
Nasal		m	n			ɲ	ŋ	
Plosive/ Affricate	tenuis	p	t	ts	ʈ	tɕ	k	
Plosive/ Affricate	aspirated	pʰ	tʰ	tsʰ	ʈʰ	tɕʰ	kʰ	
Fricative			ɬ	s		ɕ		h
Trill			r					
Approximant			l			j	w	

All consonants may begin a syllable. In the onsets of low-tone syllables, consonants are voiced. Aspirated consonants (indicated by the superscript h), /ɬ/, and /h/ are not found in low-tone syllables. The rhotic /r/ is usually a trill [r] or a fricative trill [r̝], and is voiceless in the onsets of high-tone syllables.

/t, tʰ, ts, tsʰ, s/ are dental. Descriptions of the palatal affricates and fricatives vary from alveolo-palatal to plain palatal.

Only a few consonants are found in syllable-final positions. Most common among them are /m, n, p/. Syllable-final /ŋ/ is often elided and results in the preceding vowel nasalized and prolonged, especially word-finally. Syllable-final /k/ is most often omitted when word-final as well, unless in formal speech. In literary pronunciation, liquids /r/ and /l/ may also end a syllable. Though rare, /ɕ/ is also found in syllable-final positions. No other consonants are found in syllable-final positions.

=== Vowels ===
Vowel phonemes
	Front			Back	
	short	long	rounded	short	long
Close	i	iː	yː	u	uː
Mid	e	eː	øː	o	oː
Open		ɛː		ɑ	ɑː

- When in low tone, vowels are produced with breathy voice.
- In closed syllables, /i/ varies between [i] and [ɪ], the latter being more common.
- /yː/ varies between [yː] and [ʏː].
- /e/ varies between close-mid [e] and open-mid [ɛ], the latter being common in closed syllables. /eː/ is close-mid [eː]. /eː/ may not be longer than /e/ at all, and differs from /e/ more often in quality than in length.
- Descriptions of /øː/ vary between close-mid [øː] and open-mid [œː].
- /o/ is close-mid [o], but may approach open-mid [ɔ] especially in closed syllables. /oː/ is close-mid [oː].
- /ɛː/ is slightly lower than open-mid, i.e. [ɛ̞ː].
- /ɑ/ may approach [ɐ], especially in closed syllables.
- When nasalized or followed by [ŋ], vowels are always long.

=== Phonotactics ===
Many words in Dzongkha are monosyllabic. Syllables usually take the form of CVC, CV, or VC. Syllables with complex onsets are also found, but such an onset must be a combination of an unaspirated bilabial stop and a palatal affricate. The bilabial stops in complex onsets are often omitted in colloquial speech.

== Writing system ==
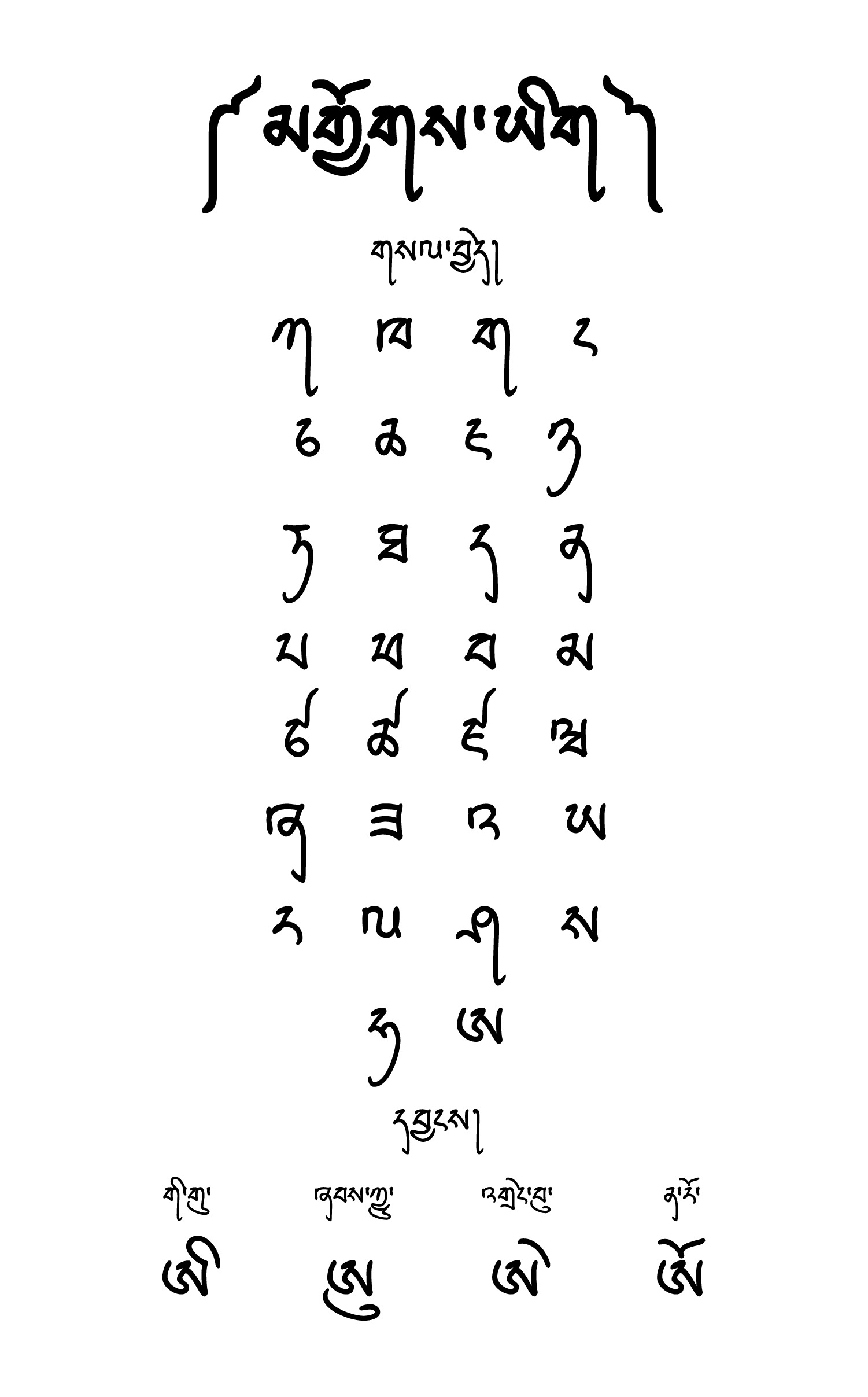
The Joyig alphabet script

The Tibetan script used to write Dzongkha has thirty basic letters, sometimes known as "radicals", for consonants. Dzongkha is usually written in Bhutanese forms of the Uchen script, forms of the Tibetan script known as Jôyi "cursive longhand" and Jôtshum "formal longhand". The print form is known simply as Tshûm.

=== Romanization ===
There are various systems of romanization and transliteration for Dzongkha, but none accurately represents its phonetic sound. The Bhutanese government adopted a transcription system known as Roman Dzongkha, devised by the linguist George van Driem, as its standard in 1991.

== Grammar ==
=== Nouns ===
==== Number ====
Dzongkha nouns distinguish between singular (unmarked) and plural, with the plural either unmarked or suffixed with ཚུ་ -tshu. The use of the plural suffix is not obligatory and is used mainly for emphasis.

==== Case ====
Dzongkha nouns are marked for 5 cases: genitive, locative, ablative, dative and ergative.

- genitive case: marks possession and is often translated as "of". There are 4 genitive suffixes in written Dzongkha:
  - གྱི་ -g°i - after words ending in མ་, ན་, ར་, ལ་.
  - གི་ -g°i - after words ending in ག་, ང་ and certain words ending in a vowel.
  - ཀྱི་ -g°i - after words ending in བ་, ད་, ས་.
  - འི་ -i after certain words ending in a vowel.
- locative case - marks location or destination and is often translated as "in", "at" or "on". It's indicated by the suffix ནང་ -na.
- ablative case - marks direction away from the noun and is often translated as "from". It's indicated by the suffix ལས་ -lä.
- dative case - marks the goal or where an activity takes place and is often translated as "to", "for" or "at". It's indicated by the suffix ལུ་ -lu.
- ergative case - used for ergative and instrumental functions. There are 3 ergative suffixes in written Dzongkha:
  - གྱིས་ -g°i - after words ending in མ་, ན་, ར་, ལ་.
  - གིས་ -g°i - after words ending in ག་, ང་ or a vowel.
  - ཀྱིས་ -g°i - after words ending in བ་, ད་, ས་.

==== Derivation ====
As in other Tibetic languages, compounding is the most common method for deriving new nouns in Dzongkha. A compound usually consists of two (or, less commonly, more) monosyllabic roots, which can be either free or bound.

Root 1	Root 2	Compound noun	Notes
བསྟོད་ tö (praise)	ར་ ra	བསྟོད་ར་ töra (praise)	ར་ ra is a bound morpheme with no meaning of its own.
ཁབ་ khap (cover)	ཏོག་ to (top)	ཁབ་ཏོག་ khapto (lid)	ཏོག་ to is a bound morpheme and means something like "top" in most (though not all) compounds.
རྡོ་ do (stone)	གནག་ nak (black)	རྡོ་གནག་ donak (graphite)	

=== Pronouns ===
==== Personal pronouns ====
Person	Singular	Plural
1st	ང༌ nga (I)	ང་བཅས༌ ngace (we)
2nd	ཁྱོད༌ chö (you)	ཁྱེད༌ chä (you all)
3rd (m)	ཁོ༌ kho (he)	ཁོང་ khong (they)
3rd (f)	མོ༌ mo (she)	ཁོང་ khong (they)
honorific	ནཱ༌ nâ (he; she; you)	ནཱ་བུ་ nâb°u (they; you all)

- The honorific pronoun ནཱ༌ nâ and its plural form are used when one wants to show respect to the person being addressed or to a 3rd person of either gender.

=== Verbs ===
Dzongkha verbs inflect for tense, aspect and mood, but unlike many languages, they do not show agreement for person and number.

==== Conjugation ====
Dzongkha verbs are mainly marked for the progressive (དོ་ -do), the witnessed past (ཡི་ -yi; ཅི་ -ci), the inferred past (ནུག་ -nu), the perfective (སོ་ so), the present continuous (པའི་སྒང་ ‑bigang ~ ‑migang; བའི་སྒང་ ‑wigang), the adhortative (གེ་ ‑ge), the optative (བཅུག་ cu), and the supine (པར་ ‑ba ~ -ma; བར་ ‑wa). They are also marked for things like the steady state present, "acquired knowledge", factual tenses, along many other modals.

==== Copula ====
In Dzongkha, there are 5 copular verbs that can be translated as "to be" in English: ཨིན་ 'ing, ཨིན་པས་ 'immä, ཡོད་ yö, འདུག་ du and སྨོ་ 'mo.

=== Adjectives ===
==== Comparison ====
The comparative is indicated by the suffix བ་ -wa ("than") while the superlative is indicated by the suffix ཤོས་ -sho ("the most", "-est").

=== Numerals ===
Hindu-Arabic numerals	Dzongkha numerals	Spelling	Roman Dzongkha
1	༡	གཅིག་	ci
2	༢	གཉིས་	’nyî
3	༣	གསུམ་	sum
4	༤	བཞི་	zhi
5	༥	ལྔ་	'nga
6	༦	དྲུག་	dr°u
7	༧	བདུན་	dün
8	༨	བརྒྱད་	gä
9	༩	དགུ་	gu
10	༡༠	བཅུ་ཐམ	cuthâm

== Vocabulary ==
The following is a sample vocabulary:

Dzongkha
Dzongkha	Transliteration (Wylie)	Pronunciation (Roman Dzongkha)	Meaning
སྟག་	stag	tâ	tiger
སྟོན་	ston	tön	to teach
སྤྱིན་	spyin	pcing	glue
རྟིངམ་	rtingma	tîm	heel
མིང་	ming	meng	name
སྨོ་ཤིག་	smo shig	'mosh	isn't it so?
དྲེལ་	drel	dr°eng	mule
གཡོན༌	gyon	'öng	left
ལྟོ་ཚང་	lto tshang	totsha	friend

== Sample text ==
The following is a sample text in Dzongkha of Article 1 of the Universal Declaration of Human Rights:

འགྲོ་ བ་ མི་ རིགས་ ག་ ར་ དབང་ ཆ་ འདྲ་ མཏམ་ འབད་ སྒྱེཝ་ ལས་ ག་ ར་ གིས་ གཅིག་ ལུ་ སྤུན་ ཆའི་ དམ་ ཚིག་ བསྟན་ དགོ།
’Gro- ba- mi- rigs- ga- ra- dbaṅ- cha- ’dra- mtam- ’bad- sgyew- las- ga- ra- gis- gcig- lu- spun- cha’i- dam- tshig- bstan- dgo
All human beings are born free and equal in dignity and rights. They are endowed with reason and conscience and should act towards one another in a spirit of brotherhood.

== See also ==
- Roman Dzongkha
- Dzongkha Braille
- Dzongkha numerals
- Languages of Bhutan
- Dzongkha keyboard layout

== Bibliography ==
- Downs, Cheryl Lynn (2011). Issues in Dzongkha Phonology: An Optimality Theoretic Approach (PDF) (Master's thesis). San Diego State University. Archived from the original (PDF) on 2017-11-10.
- Dzongkha Development Commission (2009). Rigpai Lodap: An Intermediate Dzongkha-English Dictionary (འབྲིང་རིམ་རྫོང་ཁ་ཨིང་ལིཤ་ཚིག་མཛོད་རིག་པའི་ལོ་འདབ།) (PDF). Thimphu: Dzongkha Development Commission. ISBN 978-99936-765-3-9.
- Dzongkha Development Commission (2009). Kartshok Threngwa: A Book on Dzongkha Synonyms & Antonyms (རྫོང་ཁའི་མིང་ཚིག་རྣམ་གྲངས་དང་འགལ་མིང་སྐར་ཚོགས་ཕྲེང་བ།) (PDF). Thimphu: Dzongkha Development Commission. ISBN 99936-663-13-6. Archived from the original (PDF) on 2010-11-17.
- Dzongkha Development Commission (1999). The New Dzongkha Grammar (rdzong kha'i brda gzhung gsar pa). Thimphu: Dzongkha Development Commission.
- Dzongkha Development Commission (1990). Dzongkha Rabsel Lamzang (rdzong kha rab gsal lam bzang). Thimphu: Dzongkha Development Commission.
- Dzongkha Development Authority (2005). English-Dzongkha Dictionary (ཨིང་ལིཤ་རྫོང་ཁ་ཤན་སྦྱར་ཚིག་མཛོད།). Thimphu: Dzongkha Development Authority, Ministry of Education.
- Imaeda, Yoshiro (1990). Manual of Spoken Dzongkha in Roman Transcription. Thimphu: Japan Overseas Cooperation Volunteers (JOCV), Bhutan Coordinator Office.
- Lee, Seunghun J.; Kawahara, Shigeto (2018). "The phonetic structure of Dzongkha: a preliminary study". Journal of the Phonetic Society of Japan. 22 (1): 13–20. doi:10.24467/onseikenkyu.22.1_13.
- Mazaudon, Martine. 1985. "Dzongkha Number Systems." S. Ratanakul, D. Thomas & S. Premsirat (eds.). Southeast Asian Linguistic Studies presented to André-G. Haudricourt. Bangkok: Mahidol University. 124–57
- Mazaudon, Martine; Michailovsky, Boyd (1986), Syllabicity and suprasegmentals: the Dzongkha monosyllabic noun
- Michailovsky, Boyd; Mazaudon, Martine (1989). "Lost syllables and tone contour in Dzongkha (Bhutan)". In Bradley, David; Henderson, E. J. A.; Mazaudon, Martine (eds.). Prosodic Analysis and Asian Linguistics: To Honour R.K. Sprigg. Canberra: Pacific Linguistics. pp. 115–136. doi:10.15144/PL-C104.115. hdl:1885/253672. ISBN 0-85883-389-1.
- Michailovsky, Boyd (1989). "Notes on Dzongkha orthography". In Bradley, David; Henderson, E. J. A.; Mazaudon, Martine (eds.). Prosodic Analysis and Asian Linguistics: To Honour R.K. Sprigg. Canberra: Pacific Linguistics. pp. 297–301. doi:10.15144/PL-C104.297. hdl:1885/253688. ISBN 0-85883-389-1.
- Tournadre, Nicolas (1996). "Comparaison des systèmes médiatifs de quatre dialectes tibétains (tibétain central, ladakhi, dzongkha et amdo)". In Guentchéva, Z. (ed.). L'énonciation médiatisée (PDF). Bibliothèque de l'Information Grammaticale, 34 (in French). Louvain Paris: Peeters. pp. 195–214. Archived from the original (PDF) on 2020-10-19.
- van Driem, George (1991). Guide to Official Dzongkha Romanization (PDF). Thimphu, Bhutan: Dzongkha Development Commission (DDC). Archived from the original (PDF) on 2015-09-23.
- van Driem, George (1992). The Grammar of Dzongkha (PDF). Thimphu, Bhutan: RGoB, Dzongkha Development Commission (DDC). Archived from the original on October 4, 2016.
- van Driem, George (1993). Language policy in Bhutan. SOAS, London. Archived from the original on 2018-09-11.
- van Driem, George (1994). "The Phonologies of Dzongkha and the Bhutanese Liturgical Language" (PDF). Zentralasiatische Studien (24): 36–44. Archived from the original on February 28, 2017.
- van Driem, George (2007). "Endangered Languages of Bhutan and Sikkim: South Bodish Languages". In Moseley, Christopher (ed.). Encyclopedia of the World's Endangered Languages. Routledge. pp. 294–295. ISBN 978-0-7007-1197-0.
- van Driem, George (n.d.). The First Linguistic Survey of Bhutan. Thimphu, Bhutan: Dzongkha Development Commission (DDC).
- Watters, Stephen A. (1996). A preliminary study of prosody in Dzongkha (Masters thesis). Arlington: UT at Arlington.
- Watters, Stephen A. (2018). A grammar of Dzongkha (dzo): phonology, words, and simple clauses (Doctor of Philosophy thesis). Rice University. hdl:1911/103233.
- van Driem, George; Karma Tshering of Gaselô (collab) (1998). Dzongkha. Languages of the Greater Himalayan Region. Leiden: Research School CNWS, School of Asian, African, and Amerindian Studies. ISBN 90-5789-002-X. – A language textbook with three audio compact disks.
- Karma Tshering; van Driem, George (2019) [1992]. The Grammar of Dzongkha (3rd ed.). Santa Barbara: Himalayan Linguistics. doi:10.5070/H918144245. ISBN 978-0-578-50750-7.
- English-Dzongkha Dictionary 2023 (PDF). Thimphu, Bhutan: Department of Culture and Dzongkha Development. 2023. ISBN 978-99936-765-8-4.
