= Dzongkha numerals =

Numerals used in Bhutan

Dzongkha, the national language of Bhutan, has two numeral systems, one vigesimal (base 20), and a modern decimal system. The vigesimal system remains in robust use. Ten is an auxiliary base: the -teens are formed with ten and the numerals 1–9. Ex. cu_ci

== Vigesimal ==
Numerals		Spelling	Romanisation
Hindu-Arabic	Tibetan	Spelling	Romanisation
1	༡	གཅིག	gcig
2	༢	གཉིས	gnyis
3	༣	གསུམ	gsum
4	༤	བཞི	bzhi
5	༥	ལྔ	lnga
6	༦	དྲུག	drug
7	༧	བདུན	bdun
8	༨	བརྒྱད	brgyad
9	༩	དགུ	bgu
10	༡༠	བཅུ་ཐམ	bcu tham*
11	༡༡	བཅུ་གཅིག	bcu gcig
12	༡༢	བཅུ་གཉིས	bcu gnyis
13	༡༣	བཅུ་གསུམ	bcu gsum
14	༡༤	བཅུ་བཞི	bcu bzhi
15	༡༥	བཅོ་ལྔ	bco lnga
16	༡༦	བཅུ་དྲུག	bcu drug
17	༡༧	བཅུ་བདུན	bcu bdun
18	༡༨	བཅོ་བརྒྱད	bco brgyad
19	༡༩	བཅུ་དགུ	bcu dgu
20	༢༠	ཁལ་གཅིག	khal gcig

*When it appears on its own, ‘ten’ is usually said བཅུ་ཐམ bcu tham ‘a full ten’. In combinations it is simply བཅུ bcu.

Multiples of 20 are formed from ཁལ khal. Intermediate multiples of ten are formed with ཕྱེད phyed 'half to':

30	༣༠	ཁལ་ཕྱེད་གཉིས	khal phyed gnyis	(a half to two score)
40	༤༠	ཁལ་གཉིས	khal gnyis	(two score)
50	༥༠	ཁལ་ཕྱེད་གསུམ	khal phyed gsum	(a half to three score)
100	༡༠༠	ཁལ་ལྔ	khal lnga	(five score)
200	༢༠༠	ཁལ་བཅུ་ཐམ	khal bcu tham	(ten score)
300	༣༠༠	ཁལ་བཅོ་ལྔ	khal bco lnga	(fifteen score)

400 (20²) ɲiɕu is the next unit: ɲiɕu ciː 400, ɲiɕu ɲi 800, etc. Higher powers are 8000 (20³) kʰecʰe ('a ɡreat score') and jãːcʰe 160,000 (20⁴).

== Decimal ==
The decimal system is the same up to 19. Then decades, however, are formed as unit–ten, as in Chinese, and the hundreds similarly. 20 is reported to be ɲiɕu, the same as vigesimal numeral 400; this may be lexical interference for the expected *ɲi-cu. (In any case, there is no ambiguity, because as 400 it is obligatorily ɲiɕu ciː 'one 400'.) Several of the decades have an epenthetic -p-, perhaps by analogy with 18 and 19, where the -p- presumably reflects a historical *cup 'ten':

sum-cu 30, ʑi-p-cu 40, ˈŋa-p-cu 50, ɟa-tʰampa or cik-ɟa 100 (a 'full hundred' or 'one hundred'), ɲi-ɟa 200, sum-ɟa 300, ʑi-p-ɟa 400, etc.
