= Dzongkha Braille =

Braille alphabet used for writing Dzongkha

Dzongkha Braille Bhutanese Braille
- Script type: Alphabet
- Print basis: Tibetan alphabet
- Languages: Dzongkha

Related scripts
- Parent systems: Braille: English Braille; Dzongkha Braille

Dzongkha Braille or Bhutanese Braille, is the braille alphabet for writing Dzongkha, the national language of Bhutan. It is based on English braille, with some extensions from international usage. As in print, the vowel a is not written.

Despite Dzongkha and Tibetan using nearly the same alphabet in print, the braille alphabets differ radically, with Tibetan Braille closer to German conventions and assigned letter values according to different sound correspondences.

== Alphabet ==
Consonant	ka	kha	ga	nga	ca	cha	ja	nya
Print	ཀ	ཁ	ག	ང	ཅ	ཆ	ཇ	ཉ
Braille	⠅ (braille pattern dots-13)	⠣ (braille pattern dots-126)	⠛ (braille pattern dots-1245)	⠬ (braille pattern dots-346)	⠉ (braille pattern dots-14)	⠡ (braille pattern dots-16)	⠚ (braille pattern dots-245)	⠧ (braille pattern dots-1236)

Consonant	ta	tha	da	na	pa	pha	ba	ma
Print	ཏ	ཐ	ད	ན	པ	ཕ	བ	མ
Braille	⠞ (braille pattern dots-2345)	⠹ (braille pattern dots-1456)	⠮ (braille pattern dots-2346)	⠝ (braille pattern dots-1345)	⠏ (braille pattern dots-1234)	⠋ (braille pattern dots-124)	⠃ (braille pattern dots-12)	⠍ (braille pattern dots-134)

Consonant	tsa	tsha	dza	wa	zha	za	'a	ya
Print	ཙ	ཚ	ཛ	ཝ	ཞ	ཟ	འ	ཡ
Braille	⠌ (braille pattern dots-34)	⠻ (braille pattern dots-12456)	⠵ (braille pattern dots-1356)	⠺ (braille pattern dots-2456)	⠟ (braille pattern dots-12345)	⠭ (braille pattern dots-1346)	⠱ (braille pattern dots-156)	⠽ (braille pattern dots-13456)

Consonant	ra	la	sha	sa	ha	a
Print	ར	ལ	ཤ	ས	ཧ	ཨ
Braille	⠗ (braille pattern dots-1235)	⠇ (braille pattern dots-123)	⠩ (braille pattern dots-146)	⠎ (braille pattern dots-234)	⠓ (braille pattern dots-125)	⠁ (braille pattern dots-1)

The reversed letters used in Sanskrit loanwords are indicated with the diacritic ⠐:

ཊ ⠐⠞, ཋ ⠐⠹, ཌ ⠐⠮, ཎ ⠐⠝, ཥ ⠐⠩.

The vowel "a" is inherent in a consonant letter, and is not written explicitly. Other vowels are written after a consonant as in English Braille. When a vowel occurs at the beginning of a word, the vowel letter is carried by a null consonant ཨ ⟨⠁⟩:

Vowels	a	i	u	e	o
Print (on ཨ )	ཨ	ཨི	ཨུ	ཨེ	ཨོ
Braille	⠁ (braille pattern dots-1)	⠁ (braille pattern dots-1) ⠊ (braille pattern dots-24)	⠁ (braille pattern dots-1) ⠥ (braille pattern dots-136)	⠁ (braille pattern dots-1) ⠑ (braille pattern dots-15)	⠁ (braille pattern dots-1) ⠕ (braille pattern dots-135)
	ka	ki	ku	ke	ko
Print (on ཀ )	ཀ	ཀི	ཀུ	ཀེ	ཀོ
Braille	⠅ (braille pattern dots-13)	⠅ (braille pattern dots-13) ⠊ (braille pattern dots-24)	⠅ (braille pattern dots-13) ⠥ (braille pattern dots-136)	⠅ (braille pattern dots-13) ⠑ (braille pattern dots-15)	⠅ (braille pattern dots-13) ⠕ (braille pattern dots-135)

Sanskrit vowel-marking includes:

⠁⠸⠪ ཨཿ aḥ, ⠁⠰⠳ ཨྃ aṃ,

as in ཀིཿ ⠅⠊⠸⠪ kiḥ, ཀོྃ ⠅⠕⠰⠳ koṃ.

It's not clear how conjuncts are indicated. However, the conjunct ཀྵ ⠅⠘⠐⠩ kṣa in Sanskrit loans suggests that the 45 points ⠘ conjoin two consonants.

== Punctuation ==
Digits are as in English Braille. Native punctuation (syllable divider, comma, stop) is:

Print	་	།	༎
Braille	⠂ (braille pattern dots-2)	⠸ (braille pattern dots-456)	⠆ (braille pattern dots-23)

Roman punctuation differs from that of English Braille. The question and exclamation marks, for example, are prefixed by a point 6, ⠠⠦ and ⠠⠖.

Print	,	?	!	;	:	.	...	-	/	*
Braille	⠂ (braille pattern dots-2)	⠠ (braille pattern dots-6) ⠦ (braille pattern dots-236)	⠠ (braille pattern dots-6) ⠖ (braille pattern dots-235)	⠆ (braille pattern dots-23)	⠒ (braille pattern dots-25)	⠐ (braille pattern dots-5) ⠔ (braille pattern dots-35) ⠜ (braille pattern dots-345)	⠄ (braille pattern dots-3)	⠤ (braille pattern dots-36)	⠸ (braille pattern dots-456) ⠌ (braille pattern dots-34)	⠨ (braille pattern dots-46) ⠔ (braille pattern dots-35)

Print	“ ... ”	( ... )	[ ... ]	{ ... }
Braille	...	...	...	...
