= Itô–Nisio theorem =

Convergence of random variables in Banach spaces

The Itô–Nisio theorem is a theorem from probability theory that characterizes convergence in Banach spaces. The theorem shows the equivalence of the different types of convergence for sums of independent and symmetric random variables in Banach spaces. The Itô–Nisio theorem leads to a generalization of Wiener's construction of the Brownian motion. The symmetry of the distribution in the theorem is needed in infinite spaces.

The theorem was proven by Japanese mathematicians Kiyoshi Itô and Makiko Nisio in 1968.

== Statement ==
Let $(E,\|\cdot\|)$ be a real separable Banach space with the norm induced topology, we use the Borel σ-algebra and denote the dual space as $E^*$. Let $\langle z,S\rangle:={}_{E^*}\langle z,S\rangle_E$ be the dual pairing and $i$ is the imaginary unit. Let

- $X_1, X_2, \ldots$ be an infinite sequence of independent and symmetric $E$-valued random variables defined on the same probability space,
- $S_n=\sum_{k=1}^n X_k$,
- $\mu_n$ be the probability measure of $S_n$,
- $S$ some $E$-valued random variable.

The following are equivalent:

1. $S_n\to S$ almost surely.
2. $S_n\to S$ in probability.
3. $\mu_n \to \mu$ in the Lévy–Prokhorov metric.
4. $\{\mu_n\}_{n \in \mathbb{N}}$ is uniformly tight.
5. $\langle z, S_n\rangle\to \langle z, S\rangle$ in probability for every $z\in E^*$.
6. There exists a probability measure $\mu$ on $E$ such that for every $z\in E^*$

$$\mathbb{E}[e^{i\langle z,S_n\rangle}]\to \int_{E}e^{i\langle z,x\rangle} \, \mu(\mathrm{d}x).$$

Remarks: Since $E$ is separable, item 3 (i.e. convergence in the Lévy–Prokhorov metric) is the same as convergence in distribution $\mu_n\implies \mu$. If we remove the symmetric-distribution condition:

- in a finite-dimensional setting equivalence is true for all except item 4 (i.e. the uniform tighness of $\{\mu_n\}_{n \in \mathbb{N}}$),
- in an infinite-dimensional setting $1\iff 2 \iff 3$ is true but $6\implies 3$ does not always hold.

== Literature ==
- Pap, Gyula; Heyer, Herbert (2010). Structural Aspects in the Theory of Probability. Singapore: World Scientific. p. 79.
