= Stochastic analysis on manifolds =

In mathematics, stochastic analysis on manifolds or stochastic differential geometry is the study of stochastic analysis over smooth manifolds. It is therefore a synthesis of stochastic analysis (the extension of calculus to stochastic processes) and of differential geometry.

The connection between analysis and stochastic processes stems from the fundamental relation that the infinitesimal generator of a continuous strong Markov process is a second-order elliptic operator. The infinitesimal generator of Brownian motion is the Laplace operator and the transition probability density $p(t,x,y)$ of Brownian motion is the minimal heat kernel of the heat equation. Interpreting the paths of Brownian motion as characteristic curves of the operator, Brownian motion can be seen as a stochastic counterpart of a flow to a second-order partial differential operator.

Stochastic analysis on manifolds investigates stochastic processes on non-linear state spaces or manifolds. Classical theory can be reformulated in a coordinate-free representation. In that, it is often complicated (or not possible) to formulate objects with coordinates of $\R^d$. Thus, we require an additional structure in form of a linear connection or Riemannian metric to define martingales and Brownian motion on manifolds. Therefore, controlled by the Riemannian metric, Brownian motion will be a local object by definition. However, its stochastic behaviour determines global aspects of the topology and geometry of the manifold.

Brownian motion is defined to be the diffusion process generated by the Laplace-Beltrami operator $\tfrac{1}{2}\Delta_M$ with respect to a manifold $M$ and can be constructed as the solution to a non-canonical stochastic differential equation on a Riemannian manifold. As there is no Hörmander representation of the operator $\Delta_M$ if the manifold is not parallelizable, i.e. if the tangent bundle is not trivial, there is no canonical procedure to construct Brownian motion. However, this obstacle can be overcome if the manifold is equipped with a connection: We can then introduce the stochastic horizontal lift of a semimartingale and the stochastic development by the so-called Eells-Elworthy-Malliavin construction.

The latter is a generalisation of a horizontal lift of smooth curves to horizontal curves in the frame bundle, such that the anti-development and the horizontal lift are connected by a stochastic differential equation. Using this, we can consider an SDE on the orthonormal frame bundle of a Riemannian manifold, whose solution is Brownian motion, and projects down to the (base) manifold via stochastic development. A visual representation of this construction corresponds to the construction of a spherical Brownian motion by rolling without slipping the manifold along the paths (or footprints) of Brownian motion left in Euclidean space.

Stochastic differential geometry provides insight into classical analytic problems, and offers new approaches to prove results by means of probability. For example, one can apply Brownian motion to the Dirichlet problem at infinity for Cartan-Hadamard manifolds or give a probabilistic proof of the Atiyah-Singer index theorem. Stochastic differential geometry also applies in other areas of mathematics (e.g. mathematical finance). For example, we can convert classical arbitrage theory into differential-geometric language (also called geometric arbitrage theory).

== Preface ==
For the reader's convenience and if not stated otherwise, let $(\Omega,\mathcal{A},(\mathcal{F}_t)_{t\geq 0},\mathbb P)$ be a filtered probability space and $M$ be a smooth manifold. The filtration satisfies the usual conditions, i.e. it is right-continuous and complete. We use the Stratonovich integral which obeys the classical chain rule (compared to Itô calculus). The main advantage for us lies in the fact that stochastic differential equations are then stable under diffeomorphisms $f:M\to N$ between manifolds, i.e. if $X$ is a solution, then also $f(X)$ is a solution under transformations of the stochastic differential equation.

Notation:

- $TM$ is. the tangent bundle of $M$.
- $T^*M$ is the cotangent bundle of $M$.
- $\Gamma(TM)$ is the $C^{\infty}(M)$-module of vector fields on $M$.
- $X \circ dZ$ is the Stratonovich integral.
- $C^{\infty}_c(M)$ is the space of test functions on $M$, i.e. $f\in C^{\infty}_c(M)$ is smooth and has compact support.
- $\widehat{M}:=M\cup \{\infty\}$ is the one-point compactification (or Alexandroff compactification).

== Flow processes ==
Flow processes (also called $L$-diffusions) are the probabilistic counterpart of integral curves (flow lines) of vector fields. In contrast, a flow process is defined with respect to a second-order differential operator, and thus, generalises the notion of deterministic flows being defined with respect to a first-order operator.

=== Partial differential operator in Hörmander form ===
Let $A\in \Gamma(TM)$ be a vector field, understood as a derivation by the $C^{\infty}(M)$-isomorphism

$$\Gamma(TM)\to \operatorname{Der}_{\mathbb{R}} C^{\infty}(M),\quad A\mapsto (f\mapsto Af)$$

for some $f\in C^{\infty}(M)$. The map $Af:M\to \mathbb{R}$ is defined by $Af(x):=A_x(f)$. For the composition, we set $A^2:=A(A(f))$ for some $f\in C^{\infty}(M)$.

A partial differential operator (PDO) $L:C^{\infty}(M)\to C^{\infty}(M)$ is given in Hörmander form if and only there are vector fields $A_0,A_1,\dots,A_r\in \Gamma(TM)$ and $L$ can be written in the form

$$L=A_0+\sum\limits_{i=1}^r A_i^2$$.

=== Flow process ===
Let $L$ be a PDO in Hörmander form on $M$ and $x\in M$ a starting point. An adapted and continuous $M$-valued process $X$ with $X_0=x$ is called a flow process to $L$ starting in $x$, if for every test function $f\in C^{\infty}_c(M)$ and $t\in\mathbb{R}_+$ the process

$$N(f)_t:=f(X_t)-f(X_0)-\int_0^t Lf(X_r)\mathrm{d}r$$

is a martingale, i.e.

$$\mathbb{E}\left(N(f)_t\mid\mathcal{F}_s\right)=N(f)_s,\quad \forall s\leq t$$.

=== Remark ===
For a test function $f\in C^{\infty}_c(M)$, a PDO $L$ in Hörmander form and a flow process $X_t^x$ (starting in $x$) also holds the flow equation, but in comparison to the deterministic case only in mean

$$\frac{\mathrm{d}}{\mathrm{d}t}\mathbb{E} f(X_t^x) = \mathbb{E}\left[Lf(X_t^x)\right]$$.

and we can recover the PDO by taking the time derivative at time 0, i.e.

$$\left.\frac{\mathrm{d}}{\mathrm{d}t}\right|_{t=0}\mathbb{E}f(X_t^x)=Lf(x)$$.

=== Lifetime and explosion time ===
Let $\empty \neq U\subset \mathbb{R}^n$ be open und $\xi>0$ a predictable stopping time. We call $\xi$ the lifetime of a continuous semimartingale $X=(X_t)_{0\leq t<\xi}$ on $U$ if

- there is a sequence of stopping times $(\xi_n)$ with $\xi_n\nearrow\xi$, such that $\xi_n< \xi$ $\mathbb P$-almost surely on $\{0<\xi<\infty\}$.
- the stopped process $(X_{t\wedge \xi_n})$ is a semimartingale.

Moreover, if $X_{\xi_n(\omega)}\to \partial U$ for almost all $\omega\in\{\xi<\infty\}$, we call $\xi$ explosion time.

A flow process $X$ can have a finite lifetime $\xi$. By this we mean that $X=(X)_{t<\xi}$ is defined such that if $t\to \xi$, then $\mathbb P$-almost surely on $\{\xi<\infty\}$ we have $X_t\to \infty$ in the one-point compactification $\widehat{M}:=M\cup \{\infty\}$. In that case we extend the process path-wise by $X_t:=\infty$ for $t\geq \xi$.

=== Semimartingales on a manifold ===
A process $X$ is a semimartingale on $M$, if for every $f\in C^2(M)$ the random variable $f(X)$ is an $\R$-semimartingale, i.e. the composition of any smooth function $f$ with the process $X$ is a real-valued semimartingale. It can be shown that any $M$-semimartingale is a solution of a stochastic differential equation on $M$. If the semimartingale is only defined up to a finite lifetime $\xi$, we can always construct a semimartingale with infinite lifetime by a transformation of time. A semimartingale has a quadratic variation with respect to a section in the bundle of bilinear forms on $TM$.

Introducing the Stratonovich Integral of a differential form $\alpha$ along the semimartingale $X$ we can study the so called winding behaviour of $X$, i.e. a generalisation of the winding number.

=== Stratonovich integral of a 1-form ===
Let $X$ be an $M$-valued semimartingale and $\alpha\in\Gamma(T^*M)$ be a 1-form. We call the integral $\int_X\alpha:=\int \alpha (\circ dX)$ the Stratonovich integral of $\alpha$ along $X$. For $f\in C^{\infty}(M)$ we define $f(X)\circ \alpha(\circ dX):=f(X)\circ d(\int_X\alpha)$.

== SDEs on a manifold ==
A stochastic differential equation on a manifold $M$, denoted SDE on $M$, is defined by the pair $(A,Z)$ including a bundle homomorphism (i.e. a homomorphism of vector bundles) or the ($r+1$)-tuple $(A_1,\dots,A_r,Z)$ with vector fields $A_1,\dots,A_r$ given. Using the Whitney embedding, we can show that there is a unique maximal solution to every SDE on $M$ with initial condition $X_0=x$. If we have identified the maximal solution, we recover directly a flow process $X^x$ to the operator $L$.

=== Definition ===
An SDE on $M$ is a pair $(A,Z)$, where

- $Z=(Z_t)_{t\in\mathbb{R}_+}$ is a continuous semimartingale on a finite-dimensional $\R$-vector space $E$; and
- $A:M\times E\to TM$ is a (smooth) homomorphism of vector bundles over $M$

$$A:(x,e)\mapsto A(x)e$$

where$A(x):E\to TM$ is a linear map.

The stochastic differential equation $(A,Z)$ is denoted by

$$dX=A(X)\circ dZ$$

or

$$dX=\sum\limits_{i=1}^r A_i(X)\circ dZ^i.$$

The latter follows from setting $A_i:=A(\cdot)e_i$ with respect to a basis $(e_i)_{i=1,\dots,r}$ and $\R$-valued semimartingales $(Z^{i})_{i=1,\dots,r}$ with $Z=\sum\limits_{i=1}^rZ^{i}e_i$.

As for given vector fields $A_1,\dots,A_r\in \Gamma(TM)$ there is exactly one bundle homomorphism $A$ such that $A_i:=A(\cdot)e_i$, our definition of an SDE on $M$ as $(A_1,\dots,A_r,Z)$ is plausible.

If $Z$ has only finite life time, we can transform the time horizon into the infinite case.

=== Solutions ===
Let $(A,Z)$ be an SDE on $M$ and $x_0:\Omega\to M$ an $\mathcal{F}_0$-measurable random variable. Let $(X_t)_{t<\zeta}$ be a continuous adapted $M$-valued process with life time $\zeta$ on the same probability space such as $Z$. Then $(X_t)_{t<\zeta}$ is called a solution to the SDE

$$dX=A(X)\circ dZ$$

with initial condition $X_0=x_0$ up to the life time $\zeta$, if for every test function $f \in C^{\infty}_c(M)$ the process $f(X)$ is an $\R$-valued semimartingale and for every stopping time $\tau$ with $0\leq \tau < \zeta$, it holds $\mathbb P$-almost surely

$$f(X_\tau) = f(x_0) + \int_0^\tau (df)_{X_s} A(X_s)\circ \mathrm{d}Z_s$$,

where $(df)_X:T_xM\to T_{f(x)}M$ is the push-forward (or differential) at the point $X$. Following the idea from above, by definition $f(X)$ is a semimartingale for every test function $f\in C_c^{\infty}(M)$, so that $X$ is a semimartingale on $M$.

If the lifetime is maximal, i.e.

$$\{\zeta <\infty\}\subset\left\{\lim\limits_{t\nearrow \zeta}X_t=\infty \text{ in }\widehat{M}\right\}$$

$\mathbb P$-almost surely, we call this solution the maximal solution. The lifetime of a maximal solution $X$ can be extended to all of $\R_+$ , and after extending $f$ to the whole of $\widehat{M}$, the equation

$$f(X_{t})=f(X_0)+\int_0^t (df)_X A(X)\circ dZ, \quad t\geq 0$$,

holdsup to indistinguishability.

=== Remark ===
Let $Z=(t,B)$ with a $d$-dimensional Brownian motion $B=(B_1,\dots,B_d)$, then we can show that every maximal solution starting in $x_0$ is a flow process to the operator

$$L=A_0+\frac{1}{2}\sum\limits_{i=1}^d A_i^2$$.

== Martingales and Brownian motion ==
Brownian motion on manifolds are stochastic flow processes to the Laplace-Beltrami operator. It is possible to construct Brownian motion on Riemannian manifolds $(M,g)$. However, to follow a canonical ansatz, we need some additional structure. Let $\mathcal{O}(d)$ be the orthogonal group; we consider the canonical SDE on the orthonormal frame bundle $O(M)$ over $M$, whose solution is Brownian motion. The orthonormal frame bundle is the collection of all sets $O_x(M)$ of orthonormal frames of the tangent space $T_xM$

$$O(M):=\bigcup\limits_{x\in M}O_x(M)$$

or in other words, the $\mathcal{O}(d)$-principal bundle associated to $TM$.

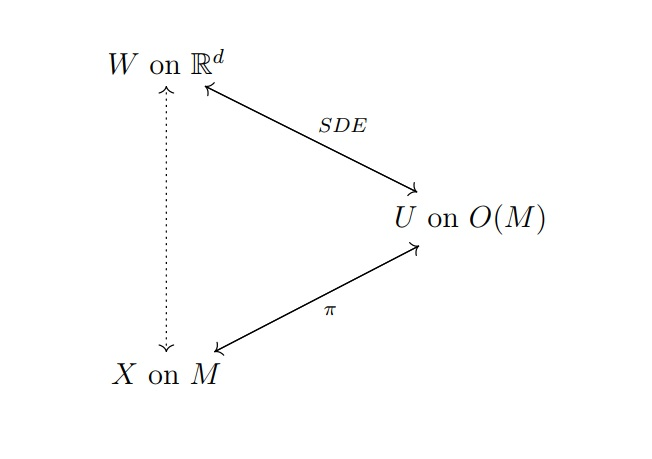
The Eells-Elworthy-Malliavin construction of the Brownian motion on manifolds

Let $W$ be an $\R^d$-valued semimartingale. The solution $U$ of the SDE

$$dU_t = \sum\limits_{i=1}^d A_i(U_t)\circ dW_t^i,\quad U_0=u_0,$$

defined by the projection $\pi:O(M)\to M$ of a Brownian motion $X$ on the Riemannian manifold, is the stochastic development from $W$ on $M$. Conversely we call $W$ the anti-development of $U$ or, respectively, $\pi(U)=X$. In short, we get the following relations: $W\leftrightarrow U \leftrightarrow X$, where

- $U$ is an $O(M)$-valued semimartingale; and
- $X$ is an $M$-valued semimartingale.

For a Riemannian manifold we always use the Levi-Civita connection and the corresponding Laplace-Beltrami operator $\Delta_M$. The key observation is that there exists a lifted version of the Laplace-Beltrami operator on the orthonormal frame bundle. The fundamental relation reads, for $f\in C^{\infty}(M)$,

$$\Delta_M f(x)=\Delta_{O(M)}(f\circ \pi)(u)$$

for all $u\in O(M)$ with $\pi u=x$, and the operator $\Delta_{O(M)}$ on $O(M)$ is well-defined for so-called horizontal vector fields. The operator $\Delta_{O(M)}$ is called Bochner's horizontal Laplace operator.

=== Martingales with linear connection ===
To define martingales, we need a linear connection $\nabla$. Using the connection, we can characterise $\nabla$-martingales, if their anti-development is a local martingale. It is also possible to define $\nabla$-martingales without using the anti-development.

We write $\stackrel{m}{=}$ to indicate that equality holds modulo differentials of local martingales.

Let $X$ be an $M$-valued semimartingale. Then $X$ is a martingale or $\nabla$-martingale, if and only if for every $f\in C^{\infty}(M)$, it holds that

$$d(f\circ X)\,\,\stackrel{m}{=}\,\,\tfrac{1}{2}(\nabla df)(dX,dX).$$

=== Brownian motion on a Riemannian manifold ===
Let $(M,g)$ be a Riemannian manifold with Laplace-Beltrami operator $\Delta_{M}$. An adapted $M$-valued process $X$ with maximal lifetime $\xi$ is called a Brownian motion$(M,g)$, if for every $f\in C^{\infty}(M)$

$$f(X)-\frac{1}{2}\int\Delta_{M} f(X)\mathrm{d}t$$

is a local $\R$-martingale with life time $\xi$. Hence, Brownian motion Bewegung is the diffusion process to $\tfrac{1}{2}\Delta_{M}$. Note that this characterisation does not provide a canonical procedure to define Brownian motion.

== Bibliography ==
- Wolfgang Hackenbroch und Anton Thalmaier, Vieweg+Teubner Verlag Wiesbaden (ed.), Stochastische Analysis: Eine Einführung in die Theorie der stetigen Semimartingale [Stochastic Analysis: An introduction to the theory of continuous semimartingales], pp. 349–544, ISBN 978-3-519-02229-9
- Nobuyuki Ikeda und Shinzo Watanabe, North Holland (ed.), Stochastic Differential Equations and Diffusion Processes
- Elton P. Hsu, American Mathematical Society (ed.), "Stochastic Analysis on Manifolds", Graduate Studies in Mathematics, vol. 38
- K. D. Elworthy (1982), Cambridge University Press (ed.), Stochastic Differential Equations on Manifolds, doi:10.1017/CBO9781107325609, ISBN 978-0-521-28767-8
