= Roman Dzongkha =

Romanization scheme for Dzongkha

Roman Dzongkha is the official romanization of Dzongkha, the national language of Bhutan. It was developed by the Dzongkha Development Commission in 1991 and represents modern Dzongkha pronunciation as spoken in Thimphu and Punakha.

== Consonants ==
Roman Dzongkha uses the following consonant symbols:

- Consonants in green are always followed by a high tone vowel.
- Consonants in blue are always followed by a low tone vowel.
- Consonants in red follow a low tone vowel by default, but can also be followed by a high tone vowel (see § Tones).

Consonants
Roman Dzongkha	Tibetan letter	Wylie transliteration	IPA	Description
k	ཀ་	k	[k]	Unaspirated k, like in English skill.
kh	ཁ་	kh	[kʰ]	Aspirated k, like in English kiss.
g	རྒ་	rg	[g]	Like the g in English goal.
g°	ག་	g	[g̥]~[k]	Unaspirated k, but followed by a murmured vowel.
c	ཅ་	c	[tɕ]	Alveolar-palatal, unaspirated. No direct equivalent in English, but similar to the ch in English churchyard.
ch	ཆ་	ch	[tɕʰ]	Alveolar-palatal, aspirated. No direct equivalent in English, but similar to the ch in English punchy.
j	རྗ་	rj	[dʑ]	Alveolar-palatal, voiced. No direct equivalent in English, but similar to the j in English jeep.
j°	ཇ་	j	[d̥ʑ]~[tɕ]	Like c, but followed by a murmured vowel.
t	ཏ་	t	[t]	Unaspirated t, like in English stop.
th	ཐ་	th	[tʰ]	Aspirated t, like in English take.
d	རྡ་	rd	[d]	Like the d in English date.
d°	ད་	d	[d̥]~[t]	Unaspirated t, but followed by a murmured vowel.
p	པ་	p	[p]	Unaspirated p, like in English space.
ph	ཕ་	ph	[pʰ]	Aspirated p, like in English part.
b	རྦ་	rb	[b]	Like the b in English boat.
b°	བ་	b	[b̥]~[p]	Unaspirated p, but followed by a murmured vowel.
pc	པྱ་	py	[ptɕ]	A combination of p + c.
pch	ཕྱ་	phy	[ptɕʰ]	A combination of p + ch.
bj	སྦྱ་	sby	[bdʑ]	A combination of b + j.
bj°	བྱ་	by	[b̥d̥ʑ]~[ptɕ]	Like pc, but followed by a murmured vowel.
tr	ཀྲ་	kr	[ʈ]	
thr	ཁྲ་	khr	[ʈʰ]	
dr	སྦྲ་	sbr	[ɖ]	
dr°	བྲ་	br	[ɖ̥]~[ʈ]	
ts	ཙ་	ts	[ts]	Unaspirated. Like the zz in English pizza.
tsh	ཚ་	tsh	[tsʰ]	Aspirated. Like the ts in English bats.
dz	ཛ་	dz	[dz]	Like the ds in English loads.
sh	ཤ་	sh	[ɕ]	Alveolo-palatal, unaspirated. No direct equivalent in English, but similar to the sh in English push.
zh	གཞ་	gzh	[ʑ]	
zh°	ཞ་	zh	[ʑ̥]~[ɕ]	
s	ས་	s	[s]	Like the s in English snake.
z	གཟ་	gz	[z]	Like the z in English zipper.
z°	ཟ་	z	[z̥]~[s]	Like s, but followed by a murmured vowel.
y	ཡ་	y	[j]	Like the y in English year.
w	ཝ་	w	[w]	Like the w in English water.
r	ར་	r	[r]	
hr	ཧྲ་	hr	[r̥]	
l	ལ་	l	[l]	Like the l in English lake.
lh	ལྷ་	lh	[ɬ]	
n	ན་	n	[n]	Like the n in English name.
ng	ང་	ng	[ŋ]	Like the ng in English song.
ny	ཉ་	ny	[ɲ]	Like the ñ in Spanish jalapeño.
m	མ་	m	[m]	Like the m in English make.
h	ཧ་	h	[h]	Like the h in English hat.

== Vowels ==
Roman Dzongkha uses the following vowel symbols:

Vowels
Roman Dzongkha	IPA	Description
a	[ɑ]	Like the a in English father.
â	[aː]	Like the a in English father, but longer.
ä	[ɛː]	Like the e in English let, but longer.
e	[e]	
ê	[eː]	
i	[i]	Like the ee in English bee, but shorter.
î	[iː]	Like the ee in English bee.
o	[o]	
ô	[oː]	
ö	[øː]	Like the ö in German schön.
u	[u]	Like the oo in English boot, but shorter.
û	[uː]	Like the oo in English boot.
ü	[yː]	Like the u in French tu, but longer.

Note: vowels are always long before ng, so â, ê, î and û do not occur in that position.

== Tones ==
Standard Dzongkha is a tonal language with two tones. As mentioned in § Consonants, certain consonants are always followed by either a high or low tone, making the tone predictable for words starting with those consonants. In Roman Dzongkha, tone is only indicated when it is unpredictable, that is, when a word starts with a vowel, voiced nasal or a glide.

- The low tone is always unmarked.
- The high tone is indicated by an apostrophe immediately preceding the letter: 'a, 'n, 'y, etc.
- The rising and falling tones of the central Dzongkha dialects are not indicated in Roman Dzongkha.

== Examples ==
Tibetan script	Wylie	Roman Dzongkha	Meaning	Notes
ས་ཁྲ་	sa khra	sapthra	map	In Roman Dzongkha, p sometimes appears at the end of a syllable, even though it is not present in Tibetan script.
འཆར་གཞི་	'char gzhi	charzhi	governmental	Syllable-final r only occurs in literary words and names borrowed from Classical Tibetan. It's always dropped in native Dzongkha words.
ལྟོ་ཚང་	lto tshang	totsha	friend	Syllable-final ng is sometimes dropped in Roman Dzongkha. This is not predictable.
བལྟ་ཤིག་	blta shig	tash	look (imperative)	Syllable-final sh corresponds to the particle ཤིག shig in Tibetan script.

The lyrics to the national anthem of Bhutan, "Druk Tsenden":

Dzongkha original

འབྲུག་ཙན་དན་བཀོད་པའི་རྒྱལ་ཁབ་ནང་༎
དཔལ་ལུགས་གཉིས་བསྟན་སྲིད་𝄆སྐྱོང་བའི་མགོན་𝄇༎
འབྲུག་རྒྱལ་པོ་མངའ་བདག་རིན་པོ་ཆེ་༎
སྐུ་འགྱུར་མེད་བརྟན་ཅིང་𝄆ཆབ་སྲིད་འཕེལ་𝄇༎
ཆོས་སངས་རྒྱས་བསྟན་པ་དར་ཞིང་རྒྱས་༎
འབངས་བདེ་སྐྱིད་ཉི་མ་𝄆ཤར་བར་ཤོག་𝄇༎

Roman Dzongkha

Dru tsend°en kepä gäkhap na
Pä lu’nyi tensi 𝄆 kyongwä gin 𝄇
Dru gäpo ’ngada rinpoche
Ku gyûme tencing 𝄆 chap si phe 𝄇
Chö sanggä tenpa dâzh°ing gä
Bang deki nyima 𝄆 shâwâsho. 𝄇

IPA (Note: See Help:IPA and Dzongkha § Phonology.)

[ɖ(ʐ)ṳ̀e̯ t͡sén.d̥è̤n ké.pɛ́ː | gɛ̤̀ː(l).kʰɑ́(p̚) nɑ̤̀]
[pɛ́ː(l) lɔ̤̀ː.ɲ(j)ɪ́ː tɛ́ːn.sɪ́ | 𝄆 cɔ́ːŋ.wɛ̤̀ː gɪ̤̀n 𝄇]
[ɖ(ʐ)ṳ̀e̯ gɛ̤̀ː(l).pó ŋɑ́.dɑ̤̀ | rɪ̤̀n.pó.t͡ɕʰé]
[kúe̯ ɟʊ̤̀ː.mè̤ tɛ́n.t͡ɕɪ́ːŋ | 𝄆 t͡ɕʰɑ́(p̚) sɪ́ pʰé(l) 𝄇]
[t͡ɕʰǿ sɑ́ːŋ.gɛ̤̀ː tɛ́n.pɑ́ | dɑ̤̀ː.ʑ̥ɪ́ːŋ gɛ̤̀ː(l)]
[bɑ̤̀ːŋ dè̤.kɪ́ ɲ(j)ɪ̤̀.mɑ̤̀ | 𝄆 ɕɑ́ː.wɑ̤̀ː.ɕó 𝄇]

Official English translation

In the Kingdom of Bhutan adorned with cypress trees,
The Protector who reigns over the realm of spiritual and secular traditions,
He is the King of Bhutan, the precious sovereign.
May His being remain unchanging, and the Kingdom prosper,
May the teachings of the Enlightened One flourish,
May the sun of peace and happiness shine over all people.

== See also ==
- Tibetan pinyin
- Wylie transliteration
