= Kurjey Lhakhang =

Buddhist monastery in Bumthang, Bhutan

Kurjey Lhakhang Monastery
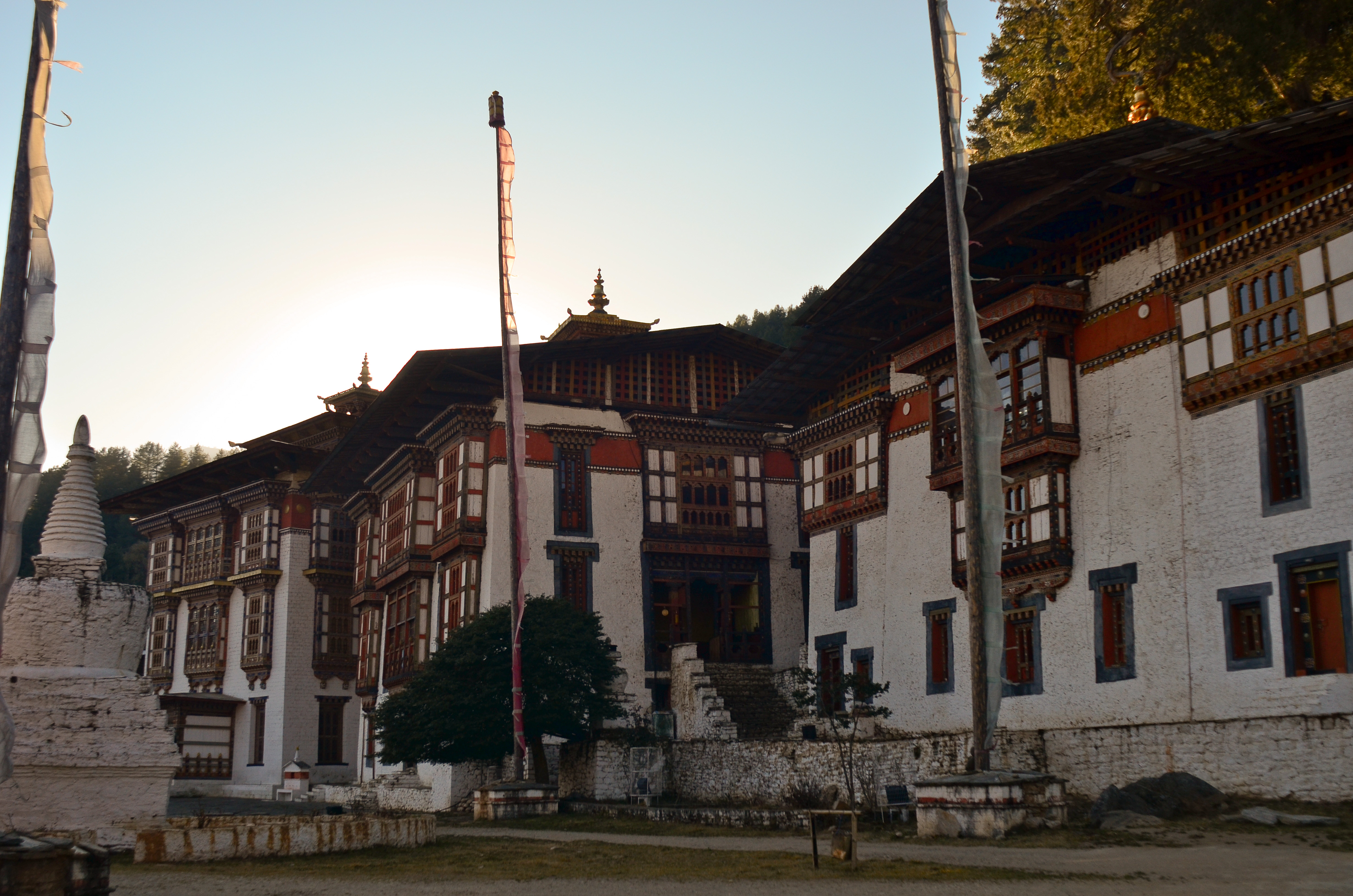
- Kurjey Lhakhang Monastery

- Location within Bhutan

Religion
- Affiliation: Tibetan Buddhism
- Deity: Padmasambhava Gautama Buddha
- Festival: Kurjey Tshechu

Location
- Location: Bumthang Valley, Bumthang District, Bhutan
- Interactive map of Kurjey Lhakhang Monastery
- Coordinates: 27.5873°N 90.7303°E

Architecture
- Style: Dzong architecture

Kurjey Lhakhang,སྐུ་རྗེས་ ཡང་ན་ གུ་རུ་རིན་པོ་ཆེ་གི་ ཞབས་རྗེས་ also known as the Kurjey Monastery, is located in the Bumthang valley in the Bumthang district of Bhutan. This is the final resting place of the remains of the first three Kings of Bhutan. Also, a large tree behind one of the temple buildings is believed to be a terma that was left there by Padmasambhava.

== Mythos ==
According to oral history, It is believed that Sindhuraja the ruler of Bumthang at the time was at war with another King called Nawchhe(Big nose) and in one of the battles with Nawchhe, Sindhu Raja had prayed for the help of the local deities but it was to no avail and Sindhu Raja had lost his son in the battle. Enraged, Sindhuraja decided to destroy all structures belonging to the local deities, angered by this Shelging Karpo the local deity stole the sog (life force) of Sindhuraja, and thus Sindhuraja fell ill due to this and the local healers were unable to do anything. At this point one of Sindhuraja's attendant sought help from Padmasambhava, who was residing in Nepal at the time, it is said that a cup of gold dust was offered to Padmasambhava, who then entered Bhutan through the route of Nabji Korphu via Mangde Chhu region. After he reached Bumthang, Sindhuraja promised him anything if he could cure him, Guru Rinpochhe then asked for Sindhuraja's daughter Moenmo Tashi Khuedron. Shelging karpo at the time was hiding inside his cave, Padmasambhava had to lure him out of the cave to subdue him. Padmasambhava started performing a cham dance, but although it managed to attract the attention of most local deities it failed to lure out Shelging Karpo. So he then asked Tashi Khuedron to fetch for a pale of water in a copper vase and this source of water which Tashi fetched water from became a source of sacred water called Kurje Drupchhu which is considered to be sacred even now and believed to cure illnesses due to its holy powers. After Tashi Khuedron fetched the water, Padmasambhava used the reflection of the light of the Sun from the vase and directed it towards the cave that Shelging Karpo was hiding in, intrigued Shelging Karpo decided to step out and find out what this reflection was, and when he stepped out Padmasambhava immediately subdued and also had him be a protector of the Dharma. Padmasambhava made Shelging Karpo return the sog of Sindhuraja and thus Sindhuraja was healed. Padmasambhava also meditated at the cave and thus left a print of his body on the cave which is why it is called Kurjey since you can see the imprint of Padmasambhava on the cave.

== Kurjey Lhakhang Complex ==
Kurje Lhakhang complex has three structures namely Guru Lhakhang, Sampa Lhundrup Lhakhang, and Ka Goen Phur Sum Lhakhang. The oldest temple, Guru Khakhang was built by king Sindhu Raja against a cave where Guru Rinpoche meditated and subdued the local deity, Shelging Karpo.
