= Dzongkha Development Commission =

Government agency of Bhutan

- རྫོང་ཁ་གོང་འཕེལ་ལྷན་ཚོགས
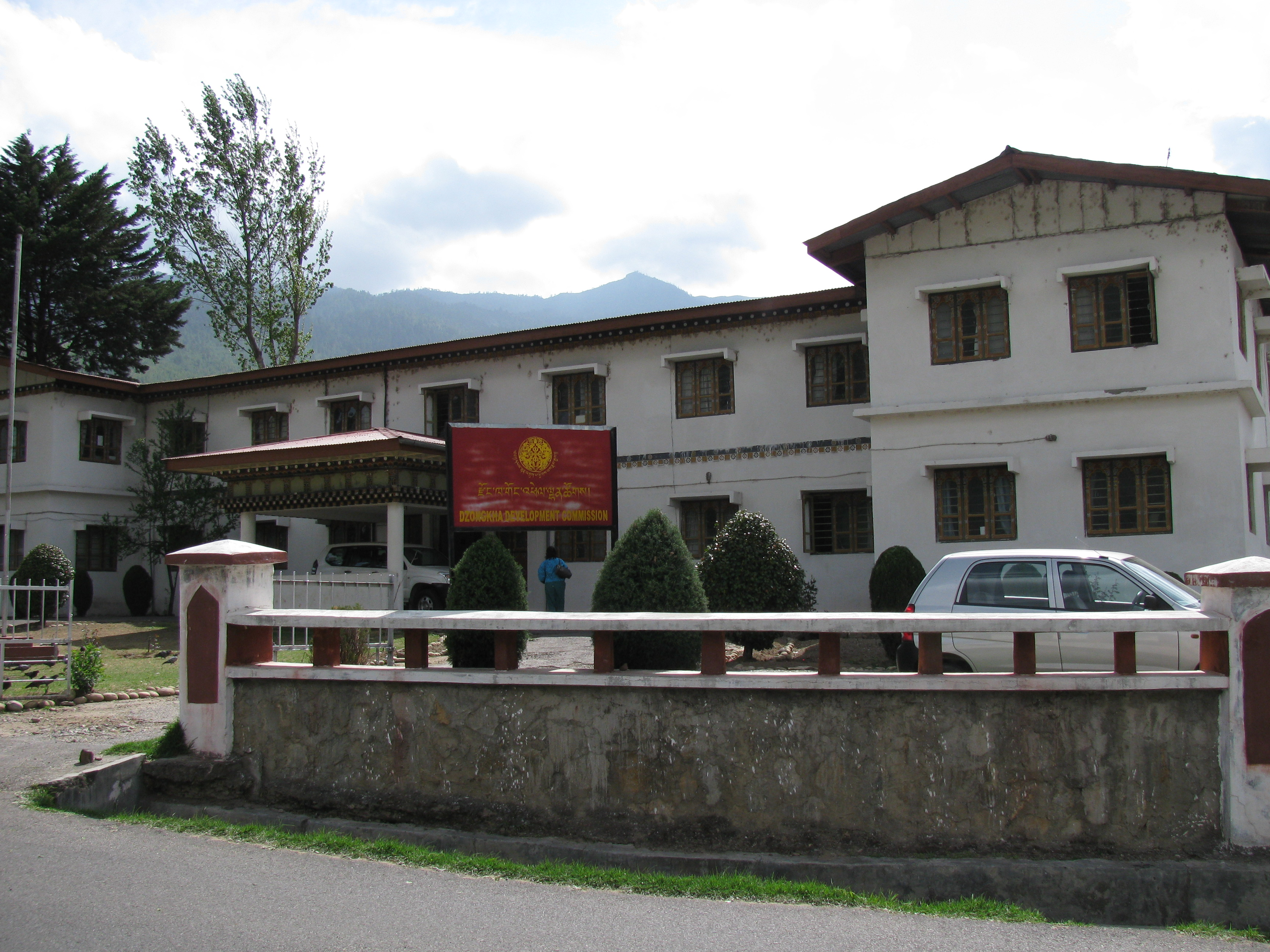
- Office of the Dzongkha Development Commission in Kawangjangtsa, Thimphu
- Abbreviation: DDC
- Formation: 1968
- Founder: Jigme Singye Wangchuck
- Type: Language regulator
- Headquarters: Thimphu, Bhutan
- Coordinates: 27°29′00″N 89°37′56″E
- Official language: Dzongkha
- Website: www.dzongkha.gov.bt

The Dzongkha Development Commission (རྫོང་ཁ་གོང་འཕེལ་ལྷན་ཚོགས; DDC) is the pre-eminent body on matters pertaining to the Dzongkha language. The DDC was officially established in 1986 by Jigme Singye Wangchuck, the fourth king of Bhutan, to preserve and promote the use of Dzongkha as the national language of Bhutan. The DDC offices are now located in the Kawajangtsa area of Thimphu, close to the National Library of Bhutan and the Ministry of Education.

The Dzongkha Development Commission consists of two parts: the Commission itself having nine eminent members (or commissioners) chaired by the Prime Minister of Bhutan; and the DDC Secretariat which carries out the day-to-day work of the commission.

The body has the task of acting as an official authority on the language. It is charged with promoting the use of Dzongkha; researching and publishing official dictionaries and grammar of the language; developing new lexical terminology; and developing software and fonts to support the language.

== See also ==
- Dzongkha language
- Roman Dzongkha
