= Shigeto Kawahara =

- Born: March 9, 1980 (age 46); Tokyo, Japan
- Education: International Christian University, University of Massachusetts Amherst
- Known for: Phonetics, phonology, linguistic analyses of Japanese rap songs and puns
- Awards: Assistant Professor
- Scientific career
- Fields: Phonetics, psychophonology, phonology
- Workplaces: Keio University
- Doctoral advisor: John Kingston

Shigeto Kawahara (川原 繁人, Kawahara Shigeto; born March 9, 1980) is a Japanese phonetician and phonologist. He is currently an associate professor in the linguistics institute at Keio University. Before he moved to Keio, he worked for the University of Georgia and Rutgers University.

He was awarded his BA (liberal arts) from International Christian University in 2002 and Ph.D. (Linguistics) from University of Massachusetts Amherst in 2007 under the supervision of John Kingston.

== Research ==
Kawahara primarily investigates phonetic bases of emergent phonological patterns. In addition to issues on the phonetics-phonology interface, he also works on the experimental investigations of phonological judgments, syntax-phonology interface as well as the phonology-morphology interface. He has also studied verbal art patterns including Japanese rap rhymes and puns.

== Major publications ==
- Kawahara, Shigeto and Kazuko Shinohara (2010) Calculating vocalic similarity through puns. Journal of the Phonetic Society of Japan 13.
- Kawahara, Shigeto and Matthew Wolf (2010) On the existence of root-initial accenting suffix: An elicitation study of Japanese [-zu]. Linguistics 44.
- Kawahara, Shigeto and Kazuko Shinohara (2009) The role of psychoacoustic similarity in Japanese puns: A corpus study. Journal of Linguistics. 45: 111-138.
- Kawahara, Shigeto (2009) Faithfulness, correspondence and perceptual similarity. Journal of the Phonetic Society of Japan 13: 51-60.
- Kawahara, Shigeto and Takahito Shinya (2008) The intonation of gapping and coordination in Japanese: Evidence for Intonational Phrase and Utterance. Phonetica 65: 62-105.
- Kawahara, Shigeto (2008) Phonetic naturalness and unnaturalness in Japanese loanword phonology. Journal of East Asian Linguistics 17: 317-330.
- Kawahara, Shigeto (2007) Half rhymes in Japanese rap song lyrics and knowledge of similarity. Journal of East Asian Linguistics 16: 113-144.
- Kawahara, Shigeto (2006) A faithfulness ranking projected from a perceptibility scale: the case of Japanese [+voice]. Language 82: 536-574
