= Probabilities and Potential =

Book by Claude Dellacherie and Paul-André Meyer

- Cover of the fourth French volume
- Author: Claude Dellacherie; Paul-André Meyer; Bernard Maisonneuve (vol. 5)
- Original title: Probabilités et Potentiel
- Language: French
- Subject: Probability theory
- Publisher: Éditions Hermann
- Publication date: 1975 (vol. 1); 1980 (vol. 2); 1983 (vol. 3); 1987 (vol. 4); 1992 (vol. 5)
- English publication date: 1978 (vol. A); 1982 (vol. B); 1988 (vol. C)

Probabilities and Potential (titled Probabilités et Potentiel in the original French) is a mathematics book written by Claude Dellacherie and Paul-André Meyer (and Bernard Maisonneuve, for volume 5 only). It was published by Éditions Hermann in five volumes between 1975 and 1992.

== Background and publication ==
In 1966 Meyer published a book on probabilistic potential theory called Probability and Potentials with publisher Blaisdell. He planned a follow-up book on Markov processes, and published a draft of the book with Springer Verlag as lecture notes entitled Processus de Markov in 1967; however, the publication of Robert Blumenthal and Ronald Getoor's 1968 book Markov Processes and Potential Theory led Meyer to shelve the plans.

In 1972 Dellacherie published the book Capacities et Processus Stochastiques with Springer Verlag. Dellacherie and Meyer's individual books were described by Joanna Mitro as "cornerstones of the 'general theory of (stochastic) processes.'"

The first volume of Dellacherie and Meyer's Probabilités et Potentiel was published in French in 1975 by Éditions Hermann, and was published in English as Probabilities and Potential by North Holland in 1978. The second volume was published in French in 1980, and in English as Probabilities and Potential B in 1982, translated by J. P. Wilson. The third and fourth French volumes were published in 1983 and 1987, and comprise chapters IX–XI and XII–XVI respectively; the third and final English volume Probabilities and Potential C was published in 1988, translated by James R. Norris, and comprises chapters IX–XIII. The fifth and final French volume, written together with Bernard Maisonneuve, was published in 1992.

== Content ==
Probabilities and Potential was intended to be an update and extension of Meyer's 1966 book. Mitro writes that the raison d'être of the book is "the existence of an intimate connection between probability theory and potential theory".

Marc Yor summarises the content of each French volume of Probabilities and Potential as follows:

- Volume 1 covers integration, analytic sets, and Gustave Choquet's theory of capacities, and includes an introduction to stochastic processes.
- Volume 2 is titled Martingale theory, and covers martingales, the Doob-Meyer decomposition, semimartingales (including results like Girsanov's theorem and the Kunita–Watanabe inequality), and stochastic integration (including Tanaka's formula).
- Volume 3 is titled Discrete potential theory, and provides an introduction to discrete potential theory, covering réduite, "new methods in capacity theory", and applications.
- Volume 4 is titled Potential theory associated with a resolvent; theory of Markov processes, and covers Markovian resolvents, excessive functions, the theory of Feller processes and Ray processes, local times, Kiyosi Itô's excursion theory, Borel right processes, the carré du champ operator, and Lévy systems.
- Volume 5 is titled Markov processes (the end), and covers excessive measures, time reversal of Markov processes, Kuznetsov measures and Palm measures, filtrations, Malliavin Calculus, the Riesz transforms, and stochastic differential equations.

=== Chapters ===
| No. | Original title | Pub. date | English title | English pub. date |
|---|---|---|---|---|
| I | Espaces mesurables | 1975 | Measurable spaces | 1978 |
| II | Lois de probabilité et espérances mathématiques | 1975 | Probability laws and mathematical expectations | 1978 |
| III | Compléments de théorie de la mesure | 1975 | Complements to measure theory | 1978 |
| IV | Processus stochastiques | 1975 | Stochastic processes | 1978 |
| V | Généralités et cas discret | 1980 | Generalities and the discrete case | 1982 |
| VI | Martingales en temps continu | 1980 | Continuous parameter martingales | 1982 |
| VII | Décomposition des surmartingales, applications | 1980 | Decomposition of supermartingales, applications | 1982 |
| VIII | Intégrales stochastiques, structure des martingales | 1980 | Stochastic integrals, structure of martingales | 1982 |
| IX | Noyaux et fonctions excessives | 1983 | Kernels and excessive functions | 1988 |
| X | Théorie des réduites et du balayage | 1983 | Theory of reductions and sweeping | 1988 |
| XI | Méthodes nouvelles en théorie des capacités, application aux maisons de jeux | 1983 | New methods in capacity theory, applications to gambling houses | 1988 |
| XII | Semi-groupes et résolvantes | 1987 | Semigroups and resolvents | 1988 |
| XIII | Construction de résolvantes et de semi-groupes | 1987 | Construction of resolvents and semigroups | 1988 |
| XIV | Processus de Markov | 1987 | not published in English | |
| XV | Fonctions excessives et fonctionnelles additives | 1987 | not published in English | |
| XVI | Processus droits et transformations multiplicatives | 1987 | not published in English | |
| XVII | Rappels sur « les processus droits » | 1992 | not published in English | |
| XVIII | Processus homogènes, retournement du temps | 1992 | not published in English | |
| XIX | Processus à naissance aléatoire | 1992 | not published in English | |
| XX | Ensembles aléatoires, excursions | 1992 | not published in English | |
| XXI | Décompositions chaotiques | 1992 | not published in English | |
| XXII | Quelques applications à l'analyse | 1992 | not published in English | |
| XXIII | Compléments de calcul stochastique | 1992 | not published in English | |
| XXIV | Récurence transfinie et mesurabilité | 1992 | not published in English | |

== Reception ==
Ronald Getoor, in his 1980 review of the first English volume, wrote that "the current generation of probabilists can only be grateful to Dellacherie and Meyer for their thorough exposition and hope that they do not tire in the task that they have set themselves." In a review of the fourth French volume, Joanna Mitro wrote that "the authors are in complete control of their subject, and the result is masterful. Meyer and Dellacherie...are responsible not only for creating a good deal of new mathematics there, but also for energetically propagating the ideas and techniques among members of the probability community...This current project is a tour de force."

In his memorial article on Meyer from 2006, Marc Yor described Probabilities and Potential as "a wonderful synthesis of the works of Paul André Meyer, starting from the publication of his book in 1966, and decanting the twenty five volumes of the [Strasbourg] Séminaire".
