= Kramkov's optional decomposition theorem =

In probability theory, Kramkov's optional decomposition theorem (or just optional decomposition theorem) is a mathematical theorem on the decomposition of a positive supermartingale $V$ with respect to a family of equivalent martingale measures into the form

$$V_t=V_0+(H\cdot X)_t-C_t,\quad t\geq 0,$$

where $C$ is an adapted (or optional) process.

The theorem is of particular interest for financial mathematics, where the interpretation is: $V$ is the wealth process of a trader, $(H\cdot X)$ is the gain/loss and $C$ the consumption process.

The theorem was proven in 1994 by Russian mathematician Dmitry Kramkov. The theorem is named after the Doob-Meyer decomposition but unlike there, the process $C$ is no longer predictable but only adapted (which, under the condition of the statement, is the same as dealing with an optional process).

== Kramkov's optional decomposition theorem ==
Let $(\Omega,\mathcal{A},\{\mathcal{F}_t\},P)$ be a filtered probability space with the filtration satisfying the usual conditions.

A $d$-dimensional process $X=(X^1,\dots,X^d)$ is locally bounded if there exist a sequence of stopping times $(\tau_n)_{n\geq 1}$ such that $\tau_n\to \infty$ almost surely if $n\to \infty$ and $|X_t^i|\leq n$ for $1\leq i\leq d$ and $t \leq \tau_n$.

=== Statement ===
Let $X=(X^1,\dots,X^d)$ be $d$-dimensional càdlàg (or RCLL) process that is locally bounded. Let $M(X)\neq \emptyset$ be the space of equivalent local martingale measures for $X$ and without loss of generality let us assume $P\in M(X)$.

Let $V$ be a positive stochastic process then $V$ is a $Q$-supermartingale for each $Q\in M(X)$ if and only if there exist an $X$-integrable and predictable process $H$ and an adapted increasing process $C$ such that

$V_t=V_0 + (H\cdot X)_t-C_t,\quad t\geq 0.$

==== Commentary ====
The statement is still true under change of measure to an equivalent measure.
