= Stochastic logarithm =

Term in stochastic calculus

In stochastic calculus, stochastic logarithm of a semimartingale $Y$such that $Y\neq0$ and $Y_-\neq0$ is the semimartingale $X$ given by
$$dX_t=\frac{dY_t}{Y_{t-}},\quad X_0=0.$$
In layperson's terms, stochastic logarithm of $Y$ measures the cumulative percentage change in $Y$.

== Notation and terminology ==
The process $X$ obtained above is commonly denoted $\mathcal{L}(Y)$. The terminology stochastic logarithm arises from the similarity of $\mathcal{L}(Y)$ to the natural logarithm $\log(Y)$: If $Y$ is absolutely continuous with respect to time and $Y\neq 0$, then $X$ solves, path-by-path, the differential equation
$$\frac{dX_t}{dt} = \frac{\frac{dY_t}{dt}}{Y_t},$$
whose solution is $X =\log|Y|-\log|Y_0|$.

== General formula and special cases ==
- Without any assumptions on the semimartingale $Y$ (other than $Y\neq 0, Y_-\neq 0$), one has
  $$\mathcal{L}(Y)_t = \log\Biggl|\frac{Y_t}{Y_0}\Biggl|
+\frac12\int_0^t\frac{d[Y]^c_s}{Y_{s-}^2}
+\sum_{s\le t}\Biggl(\log\Biggl| 1 + \frac{\Delta Y_s}{Y_{s-}} \Biggr|
-\frac{\Delta Y_s}{Y_{s-}}\Biggr),\qquad t\ge0,$$
  where $[Y]^c$ is the continuous part of quadratic variation of $Y$ and the sum extends over the (countably many) jumps of $Y$ up to time $t$.
- If $Y$ is continuous, then
  $$\mathcal{L}(Y)_t = \log\Biggl|\frac{Y_t}{Y_0}\Biggl|
+\frac12\int_0^t\frac{d[Y]^c_s}{Y_{s-}^2},\qquad t\ge0.$$
  In particular, if $Y$ is a geometric Brownian motion, then $X$ is a Brownian motion with a constant drift rate.
- If $Y$ is continuous and of finite variation, then
  $$\mathcal{L}(Y) = \log\Biggl|\frac{Y}{Y_0}\Biggl|.$$
  Here $Y$ need not be differentiable with respect to time; for example, $Y$ can equal 1 plus the Cantor function.

== Properties ==
- Stochastic logarithm is an inverse operation to stochastic exponential: If $\Delta X\neq -1$, then $\mathcal{L}(\mathcal{E}(X)) = X-X_0$. Conversely, if $Y\neq 0$ and $Y_-\neq 0$, then $\mathcal{E}(\mathcal{L}(Y)) = Y/Y_0$.
- Unlike the natural logarithm $\log(Y_t)$, which depends only of the value of $Y$ at time $t$, the stochastic logarithm $\mathcal{L}(Y)_t$ depends not only on $Y_t$ but on the whole history of $Y$ in the time interval $[0,t]$. For this reason one must write $\mathcal{L}(Y)_t$ and not $\mathcal{L}(Y_t)$.
- Stochastic logarithm of a local martingale that does not vanish together with its left limit is again a local martingale.
- All the formulae and properties above apply also to stochastic logarithm of a complex-valued $Y$.
- Stochastic logarithm can be defined also for processes $Y$ that are absorbed in zero after jumping to zero. Such definition is meaningful up to the first time that $Y$ reaches $0$ continuously.

== Useful identities ==
- Converse of the Yor formula: If $Y^{(1)},Y^{(2)}$ do not vanish together with their left limits, then
  $$\mathcal{L}\bigl(Y^{(1)}Y^{(2)}\bigr) = \mathcal{L}\bigl(Y^{(1)}\bigr)
+ \mathcal{L}\bigl(Y^{(2)}\bigr)
+ \bigl[\mathcal{L}\bigl(Y^{(1)}\bigr),\mathcal{L}\bigl(Y^{(2)}\bigr)\bigr].$$
- Stochastic logarithm of $1/\mathcal{E}(X)$: If $\Delta X\neq -1$, then
  $$\mathcal{L}\biggl(\frac{1}{\mathcal{E}(X)}\biggr)_t = X_0-X_t-[X]^c_t
+\sum_{s\leq t}\frac{(\Delta X_s)^2}{1+\Delta X_s}.$$

== Applications ==
- Girsanov's theorem can be paraphrased as follows: Let $Q$ be a probability measure equivalent to another probability measure $P$. Denote by $Z$ the uniformly integrable martingale closed by $Z_\infty = dQ/dP$. For a semimartingale $U$ the following are equivalent:
  1. Process $U$ is special under $Q$.
  2. Process $U+[U,\mathcal{L}(Z)]$ is special under $P$.
- + If either of these conditions holds, then the $Q$-drift of $U$ equals the $P$-drift of $U+[U,\mathcal{L}(Z)]$.

== See also ==
- Stochastic exponential
