= Burgess Davis =

American mathematician

Burgess James Davis
- Citizenship: American
- Education: University of Illinois
- Known for: Burkholder–Davis–Gundy inequality
- Honors: Fellow of the Institute of Mathematical Statistics
- Scientific career
- Fields: Mathematics; Statistics
- Workplaces: Rutgers University; Purdue University
- Doctoral advisor: Donald Burkholder

Burgess James Davis is an American mathematician and statistician known for his research in probability theory and mathematical analysis, particularly his work on martingales, Brownian motion, and random walks. He is a professor emeritus in the Departments of Statistics and Mathematics at Purdue University.

== Education ==
Davis earned his B.S. degree from Ohio State University in 1965, followed by an M.S. and Ph.D. from the University of Illinois in 1966 and 1968 respectively. His doctoral advisor was Donald Burkholder.

== Career ==
He joined the faculty of Rutgers University from 1968 to 1974. In 1974 he joined Purdue University where he served as a professor of Statistics and Mathematics until achieving emeritus status in 2014.

From 1981 to 1987, Davis served as associate editor of the Annals of Probability, a publication of the Institute of Mathematical Statistics, and then as editor from 1991 to 1993. He also served as associate editor (from 1988 to 1990) of the Transactions of the AMS and (from 1999 to 2002) of the Illinois Journal of Math.

== Research contributions ==
Davis's research focuses on the interconnections between classical analysis (particularly harmonic analysis), probability theory, and stochastic processes. His most notable contributions include:

- Stochastic analysis and martingale theory: His work established key inequalities for stochastic integrals and martingales, which includes a strong version of the Burkholder–Gundy inequalities, which are central to modern stochastic analysis.
- Brownian motion and potential theory: He explored the relationship between Brownian motion and concepts from complex analysis and potential theory, including the work on the moments of the lifetime and conditioned Brownian motion in various domains.
- Random walks: Davis has published research on reinforced random walks, a class of self-interacting random processes where the probability of a step is proportional to the time already spent at the neighboring vertex.

== Awards and honors ==
- Davis was named a Top Ten Outstanding Teacher in the College of Science in 1999.
- He was elected a Fellow of the Institute of Mathematical Statistics, a distinction recognizing individuals who have made "outstanding contributions to the development and application of statistics and probability."

== Selected publications ==
- Davis, B. (1969). Comparison tests for martingale inequalities. Annals of Mathematical Statistics, 40(2), 505–508.
- Davis, B. (1976). On the $L^p$ norms of stochastic integrals and other martingales. Duke Mathematical Journal, 43(4), 697–704.
- Davis, B. (1979). Brownian motion and analytic functions. Annals of Probability, 7(6), 913–932.
- Davis, B., & Volkov, S. (2004). Vertex reinforced random jump processes on trees and finite graphs. Probability Theory and Related Fields, 128(1), 42–62.
