= Doob decomposition theorem =

Mathematical theorem in stochastic processes

In the theory of stochastic processes in discrete time, a part of the mathematical theory of probability, the Doob decomposition theorem gives a unique decomposition of every adapted and integrable stochastic process as the sum of a martingale and a predictable process (or "drift") starting at zero. The theorem was proved by and is named for Joseph L. Doob.

The analogous theorem in the continuous-time case is the Doob–Meyer decomposition theorem.

== Statement ==
Let $(\Omega, \mathcal{F}, \mathbb{P})$ be a probability space, I = {0, 1, 2, ..., N} with $N \in \N$ or $I = \N_0$ a finite or countably infinite index set, $(\mathcal{F}_n)_{n \in I}$ a filtration of $\mathcal{F}$, and X = (X_{n})_{n∈I} an adapted stochastic process with E[|X_{n}|] < ∞ for all n ∈ I. Then there exist a martingale M = (M_{n})_{n∈I} and an integrable predictable process A = (A_{n})_{n∈I} starting with A_{0} = 0 such that X_{n} = M_{n} + A_{n} for every n ∈ I. Here predictable means that A_{n} is $\mathcal{F}_{n-1}$-measurable for every n ∈ I \ {0}. This decomposition is almost surely unique.

=== Remark ===
The theorem is valid word for word also for stochastic processes X taking values in the d-dimensional Euclidean space $\Reals^d$ or the complex vector space $\Complex^d$. This follows from the one-dimensional version by considering the components individually.

== Proof ==
=== Existence ===
Using conditional expectations, define the processes A and M, for every n ∈ I, explicitly by

$A_n=\sum_{k=1}^n\bigl(\mathbb{E}[X_k\,|\,\mathcal{F}_{k-1}]-X_{k-1}\bigr)$	1

and

$M_n=X_0+\sum_{k=1}^n\bigl(X_k-\mathbb{E}[X_k\,|\,\mathcal{F}_{k-1}]\bigr),$	2

where the sums for n = 0 are empty and defined as zero. Here A adds up the expected increments of X, and M adds up the surprises, i.e., the part of every X_{k} that is not known one time step before. Due to these definitions, A_{n+1} (if n + 1 ∈ I) and M_{n} are F_{n}-measurable because the process X is adapted, E[|A_{n}|] < ∞ and E[|M_{n}|] < ∞ because the process X is integrable, and the decomposition X_{n} = M_{n} + A_{n} is valid for every n ∈ I. The martingale property

$\mathbb{E}[M_n-M_{n-1}\,|\,\mathcal{F}_{n-1}]=0$ a.s.

also follows from the above definition (2), for every n ∈ I \ {0}.

=== Uniqueness ===
To prove uniqueness, let X = M' + A' be an additional decomposition. Then the process Y := M − M' = A' − A is a martingale, implying that

$\mathbb{E}[Y_n\,|\,\mathcal{F}_{n-1}]=Y_{n-1}$ a.s.,

and also predictable, implying that

$\mathbb{E}[Y_n\,|\,\mathcal{F}_{n-1}]= Y_n$ a.s.

for any n ∈ I \ {0}. Since Y_{0} = A'_{0} − A_{0} = 0 by the convention about the starting point of the predictable processes, this implies iteratively that Y_{n} = 0 almost surely for all n ∈ I, hence the decomposition is almost surely unique.

== Corollary ==
A real-valued stochastic process X is a submartingale if and only if it has a Doob decomposition into a martingale M and an integrable predictable process A that is almost surely increasing. It is a supermartingale, if and only if A is almost surely decreasing.

=== Proof ===
If X is a submartingale, then

$\mathbb{E}[X_k\,|\,\mathcal{F}_{k-1}]\ge X_{k-1}$ a.s.

for all k ∈ I \ {0}, which is equivalent to saying that every term in definition (1) of A is almost surely positive, hence A is almost surely increasing. The equivalence for supermartingales is proved similarly.

== Example ==
Let X = (X_{n})_{n∈$\mathbb{N}_0$} be a sequence in independent, integrable, real-valued random variables. They are adapted to the filtration generated by the sequence, i.e. F_{n} = σ(X_{0}, . . . , X_{n}) for all $n \isin \mathbb{N}_0.$ By (1) and (2), the Doob decomposition is given by

$$A_n=\sum_{k=1}^{n}\bigl(\mathbb{E}[X_k]-X_{k-1}\bigr),\quad n\in\mathbb{N}_0,$$

and

$$M_n=X_0+\sum_{k=1}^{n}\bigl(X_k-\mathbb{E}[X_k]\bigr),\quad n\in\mathbb{N}_0.$$

If the random variables of the original sequence X have mean zero, this simplifies to

$A_n=-\sum_{k=0}^{n-1}X_k$ and $M_n=\sum_{k=0}^{n}X_k,\quad n\in\mathbb{N}_0,$

hence both processes are (possibly time-inhomogeneous) random walks. If the sequence X = (X_{n})_{n∈$\mathbb{N}_0$} consists of symmetric random variables taking the values +1 and −1, then X is bounded, but the martingale M and the predictable process A are unbounded simple random walks (and not uniformly integrable), and Doob's optional stopping theorem might not be applicable to the martingale M unless the stopping time has a finite expectation.

== Application ==
In mathematical finance, the Doob decomposition theorem can be used to determine the largest optimal exercise time of an American option. Let X = (X_{0}, X_{1}, . . . , X_{N}) denote the non-negative, discounted payoffs of an American option in a N-period financial market model, adapted to a filtration (F_{0}, F_{1}, . . . , F_{N}), and let $\mathbb{Q}$g denote an equivalent martingale measure. Let U = (U_{0}, U_{1}, . . . , U_{N}) denote the Snell envelope of X with respect to $\mathbb{Q}$. The Snell envelope is the smallest $\mathbb{Q}$-supermartingale dominating X and in a complete financial market it represents the minimal amount of capital necessary to hedge the American option up to maturity. Let U = M + A denote the Doob decomposition with respect to $\mathbb{Q}$ of the Snell envelope U into a martingale M = (M_{0}, M_{1}, . . . , M_{N}) and a decreasing predictable process A = (A_{0}, A_{1}, . . . , A_{N}) with A_{0} = 0. Then the largest stopping time to exercise the American option in an optimal way is

$$\tau_{\text{max}}:=\begin{cases}N&\text{if }A_N=0,\\\min\{n\in\{0,\dots,N-1\}\mid A_{n+1}<0\}&\text{if } A_N<0.\end{cases}$$

Since A is predictable, the event {τ_{max} = n} = {A_{n} = 0, A_{n+1} < 0} is in F_{n} for every n ∈ {0, 1, . . . , N − 1}, hence τ_{max} is indeed a stopping time. It gives the last moment before the discounted value of the American option will drop in expectation; up to time τ_{max} the discounted value process U is a martingale with respect to $\mathbb{Q}$.

== Generalization ==
The Doob decomposition theorem can be generalized from probability spaces to σ-finite measure spaces.
