= Kazamaki's condition =

In mathematics, Kazamaki's condition gives a sufficient criterion ensuring that the Doléans-Dade exponential of a local martingale is a true martingale. This is particularly important if Girsanov's theorem is to be applied to perform a change of measure. Kazamaki's condition is more general than Novikov's condition.

== Statement of Kazamaki's condition ==
Let $M = (M_t)_{t \ge 0}$ be a continuous local martingale with respect to a right-continuous filtration $(\mathcal{F}_t)_{t \ge 0}$. If $(\exp(M_t/2))_{t \ge 0}$ is a uniformly integrable submartingale, then the Doléans-Dade exponential Ɛ(M) of M is a uniformly integrable martingale.
