= Doléans-Dade exponential =

Unique strong solution of a stochastic differential equation

In stochastic calculus, the Doléans-Dade exponential or stochastic exponential of a semimartingale X is the unique strong solution of the stochastic differential equation
$$dY_t = Y_{t-}\,dX_t,\quad\quad Y_0=1,$$
where $Y_{-}$ denotes the process of left limits, i.e., $Y_{t-}=\lim_{s\uparrow t}Y_s$.

The concept is named after Catherine Doléans-Dade. The stochastic exponential plays an important role in the formulation of Girsanov's theorem and arises naturally in all applications where relative changes are important since $X$ measures the cumulative percentage change in $Y$.

== Notation and terminology ==
Process $Y$ obtained above is commonly denoted by $\mathcal{E}(X)$. The terminology "stochastic exponential" arises from the similarity of $\mathcal{E}(X)=Y$ to the natural exponential of $X$: If X is absolutely continuous with respect to time, then Y solves, path-by-path, the differential equation $dY_t/\mathrm{d}t = Y_tdX_t/dt$, whose solution is $Y=\exp(X-X_0)$.

== General formula and special cases ==
- Without any assumptions on the semimartingale $X$, one has
  $$\mathcal{E}(X)_t = \exp\Bigl(X_t-X_0-\frac12[X]^c_t\Bigr)\prod_{s\le t}(1+\Delta X_s) \exp (-\Delta X_s),\qquad t\ge0,$$
  where $[X]^c$ is the continuous part of quadratic variation of $X$ and the product extends over the (countably many) jumps of X up to time t.
- If $X$ is continuous, then
  $$\mathcal{E}(X) = \exp\Bigl(X-X_0-\frac12[X]\Bigr).$$
  In particular, if $X$ is a Brownian motion, then the Doléans-Dade exponential is a geometric Brownian motion.
- If $X$ is continuous and of finite variation, then
  $$\mathcal{E}(X)=\exp(X-X_0).$$
  Here $X$ need not be differentiable with respect to time; for example, $X$ can be the Cantor function.

== Properties ==
- A stochastic exponential cannot go to zero continuously; it can only jump to zero. Hence, the stochastic exponential of a continuous semimartingale is always strictly positive.
- Once $\mathcal{E}(X)$ has jumped to zero, it is absorbed in zero. The first time it jumps to zero is precisely the first time when $\Delta X=-1$.
- Unlike the natural exponential $\exp(X_t)$, which depends only of the value of $X$ at time $t$, the stochastic exponential $\mathcal{E}(X)_t$ depends not only on $X_t$ but on the whole history of $X$ in the time interval $[0,t]$. For this reason one must write $\mathcal{E}(X)_t$ and not $\mathcal{E}(X_t)$.
- Natural exponential of a semimartingale can always be written as a stochastic exponential of another semimartingale but not the other way around.
- Stochastic exponential of a local martingale is again a local martingale.
- All the formulae and properties above apply also to stochastic exponential of a complex-valued $X$. This has application in the theory of conformal martingales and in the calculation of characteristic functions.

== Useful identities ==
Yor's formula: for any two semimartingales $U$ and $V$ one has
$$\mathcal{E}(U)\mathcal{E}(V) = \mathcal{E}(U+V+[U,V])$$

== Applications ==
- The stochastic exponential of a local martingale appears in the statement of Girsanov theorem. Criteria to ensure that the stochastic exponential $\mathcal{E}(X)$ of a continuous local martingale $X$ is a martingale are given by Kazamaki's condition, Novikov's condition, and Beneš's condition.

== Derivation of the explicit formula for continuous semimartingales ==
For any continuous semimartingale X, take for granted that $Y$ is continuous and strictly positive. Then applying Itō's formula with ƒ(Y) = log(Y) gives

$$\begin{align}
\log(Y_t)-\log(Y_0) &= \int_0^t\frac{1}{Y_u}\,dY_u -\int_0^t\frac{1}{2Y_u^2}\,d[Y]_u
= X_t-X_0 - \frac{1}{2}[X]_t.
\end{align}$$

Exponentiating with $Y_0=1$ gives the solution

$$Y_t = \exp\Bigl(X_t-X_0-\frac12[X]_t\Bigr),\qquad t\ge0.$$

This differs from what might be expected by comparison with the case where X has finite variation due to the existence of the quadratic variation term [X] in the solution.

== See also ==
- Stochastic logarithm
