= Carré du champ operator =

Operator in analysis and probability theory

The carré du champ operator (French for square of a field operator) is a bilinear, symmetric operator from analysis and probability theory. The carré du champ operator measures how far an infinitesimal generator is from being a derivation.

The operator was introduced in 1969 by Hiroshi Kunita and independently discovered in 1976 by Jean-Pierre Roth in his doctoral thesis.

The name "carré du champ" comes from electrostatics.

== Carré du champ operator for a Markov semigroup ==
Let $(X,\mathcal{E},\mu)$ be a σ-finite measure space, $\{P_t\}_{t\geq 0}$ a Markov semigroup of non-negative operators on $L^2(X,\mu)$, $A$ the infinitesimal generator of $\{P_t\}_{t\geq 0}$ and $\mathcal{A}$ the algebra of functions in $\mathcal{D}(A)$, i.e. a vector space such that for all $f,g\in \mathcal{A}$ also $fg\in \mathcal{A}$.

=== Carré du champ operator ===
The carré du champ operator of a Markovian semigroup $\{P_t\}_{t\geq 0}$ is the operator $\Gamma:\mathcal{A}\times \mathcal{A}\to\mathbb{R}$ defined (following P. A. Meyer) as

$$\Gamma(f,g)=\frac{1}{2}\left(A(fg)-fA(g)-gA(f)\right)$$

for all $f,g \in \mathcal{A}$.

=== Properties ===
From the definition, it follows that

$$\Gamma(f,g)=\lim\limits_{t\to 0}\frac{1}{2t}\left(P_t(fg)-P_tfP_tg\right).$$

For $f\in\mathcal{A}$ we have $P_t(f^2)\geq (P_tf)^2$ and thus $A(f^2)\geq 2 fAf$ and

$$\Gamma(f):=\Gamma(f,f)\geq 0,\quad \forall f\in\mathcal{A}$$

therefore the carré du champ operator is positive.

The domain is

$$\mathcal{D}(A):=\left\{f \in L^2(X,\mu) ;\;\lim\limits_{t\downarrow 0}\frac{P_t f-f}{t}\text{ exists and is in } L^2(X,\mu)\right\}.$$

=== Remarks ===
- The definition in Roth's thesis is slightly different.

== Bibliography ==
- Ledoux, Michel (2000). "The geometry of Markov diffusion generators". Annales de la Faculté des Sciences de Toulouse: Mathématiques. Série 6. 9 (2): 305–366. doi:10.5802/afst.962. hdl:20.500.11850/146400.
- Meyer, Paul-André (1976). "L'Operateur carré du champ". Séminaire de Probabilités X Université de Strasbourg. Lecture Notes in Mathematics (in French). Vol. 511. Berlin, Heidelberg: Springer. pp. 142–161. doi:10.1007/BFb0101102. ISBN 978-3-540-07681-0.
