= Paul-André Meyer =

French mathematician

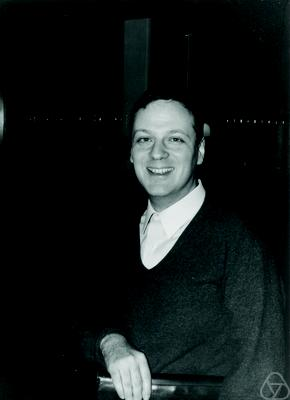
- Born: 21 August 1934; Boulogne-Billancourt
- Died: 30 January 2003 (aged 68)
- Education: École Normale Supérieure
- Known for: Doob-Meyer decomposition theorem Theory of semimartingales
- Awards: Ampère Prize (1982)
- Scientific career
- Fields: Mathematics
- Workplaces: Institut de Recherche Mathématique
- Doctoral advisor: Jacques Deny
- Doctoral students: Dominique Bakry; Claude Dellacherie; Catherine Doléans-Dade

Paul-André Meyer (21 August 1934 – 30 January 2003) was a French mathematician, who played a major role in the development of the general theory of stochastic processes. He worked at the Institut de Recherche Mathématique (IRMA) in Strasbourg and is known as the founder of the 'Strasbourg school' in stochastic analysis.

== Biography ==
Meyer was born in 1934 in Boulogne, a suburb of Paris. His family fled from France in 1940 and sailed to Argentina, settling in Buenos Aires, where Paul-André attended a French school. He returned to Paris in 1946 and entered the Lycée Janson de Sailly, where he first encountered advanced mathematics through his teacher, M Heilbronn. He entered the École Normale Supérieure in 1954 where he studied mathematics. There, he attended lectures on probability by Michel Loève, a former disciple of Paul Lévy who had come from Berkeley to spend a year in Paris. These lectures triggered Meyer's interest in the theory of stochastic processes, and he went on to write a thesis in potential theory, on multiplicative and additive functionals of Markov processes, under the supervision of Jacques Deny.

After his doctoral thesis, Meyer traveled to the United States and worked for a couple of years with the American mathematician Joseph Doob, who was then developing new ideas in the theory of stochastic processes. It was there that he derived his famous theorem on the decomposition of a submartingale, now known as the Doob–Meyer decomposition. After his return to France he established a group in Strasbourg where he ran his famous 'Séminaire de probabilités de Strasbourg', which became an epicenter for the development of the theory of stochastic processes in France for two decades.

== Scientific work ==
Meyer is best known for his continuous-time analog of Doob's decomposition of a submartingale, known as the Doob–Meyer decomposition and his work on the 'general theory' of stochastic processes, published in his monumental book Probabilities and Potential, written with Claude Dellacherie.

Some of his main areas of research in probability theory were the general theory of stochastic processes, Markov processes, stochastic integration, stochastic differential geometry and quantum probability. His most cited book is Probabilities and Potential B, written with Claude Dellacherie. The preceding book is the English translation of the second book in a series of five written by Meyer and Dellacherie from 1975 to 1992 and elaborated from Meyer's pioneering book Probabilités et Potentiel, published in 1966.

In the period 1966-1980 Meyer organised the Seminaire de Probabilities in Strasbourg, and he and his co-workers developed what is called the general theory of processes.

This theory was concerned with the mathematical foundations of the theory of continuous time stochastic processes, especially Markov processes. Notable achievements of the 'Strasbourg School' were the development of stochastic integrals for semimartingales, and the concept of a predictable (or previsible) process.

IRMA created an annual prize in his memory; the first Paul André Meyer prize was awarded in 2004 .

Persi Diaconis of Stanford University wrote about Meyer that:

I only met Paul-Andre Meyer once (at Luminy in 1995). He kindly stayed around after my talk and we spoke for about an hour. I was studying rates of convergence of finite state space Markov chains. He made it clear that, for him, finite state space Markov chains is a trivial subject. Hurt but undaunted, I explained some of our results and methods. He thought about it and said, "I see, yes, those are very hard problems". The analytic parts of Dirichlet space theory have played an enormous role in my recent work. I am sure that there is much to learn from the abstract theory as well. In the present paper I treat rates of convergence for a simple Markov chain. I am sorry not to have another hour with Paul-Andre Meyer. Perhaps he would say "This piece of our story might help you". Perhaps one of his students or colleagues can help fill the void.

== Some books and articles written by Paul-André Meyer ==
- C. Dellacherie, P.A. Meyer: Probabilities and Potential B, North-Holland, Amsterdam New York 1982.
- P.A. Meyer: " Martingales and Stochastic Integrals I," Springer Lecture Notes in Mathematics 284, 1972.
- Brelot's axiomatic theory of the Dirichlet problem and Hunt's theory, Annales de l'Institut Fourier, 13 no. 2 (1963), p. 357–372
- Intégrales stochastiques I, Séminaire de probabilités de Strasbourg, 1 (1967), p. 72–94
- Intégrales stochastiques II, Séminaire de probabilités de Strasbourg, 1 (1967), p. 95–117
- Intégrales stochastiques III, Séminaire de probabilités de Strasbourg, 1 (1967), p. 118–141
- Intégrales stochastiques IV, Séminaire de probabilités de Strasbourg, 1 (1967), p. 124–162
- Generation of sigma-fields by step processes, Séminaire de probabilités de Strasbourg, 10 (1976), p. 118–124
- P.A. Meyer: ' Inégalités de normes pour les integrales stochastiques," Séminaire de Probabilités XII, Springer Lecture Notes in Math. 649, 757–762, 1978.
