= Kunita–Watanabe inequality =

In stochastic calculus, the Kunita–Watanabe inequality is a generalization of the Cauchy–Schwarz inequality to integrals of stochastic processes. It was first obtained by Hiroshi Kunita and Shinzo Watanabe and plays a fundamental role in their extension of Ito's stochastic integral to square-integrable martingales.

== Statement of the theorem ==
Let M, N be continuous local martingales and H, K measurable processes. Then

$$\int_0^t \left| H_s \right| \left| K_s \right| \left| \mathrm{d} \langle M,N \rangle_s \right| \leq  \sqrt{\int_0^t  H_s^2  \,\mathrm{d} \langle M \rangle_s} \sqrt{\int_0^t K_s^2 \,\mathrm{d} \langle N \rangle_s}$$

where the angled brackets indicates the quadratic variation and quadratic covariation operators. The integrals are understood in the Lebesgue–Stieltjes sense.
