= Bessel process =

Mathematical process for stochastic differential equations

In mathematics, a Bessel process, named after Friedrich Bessel. The n-dimensional Bessel process is the solution to the stochastic differential equation (SDE)

$$dX_t = dW_t + \frac{n-1}{2}\frac{dt}{X_t}$$

where W is a 1-dimensional Wiener process (Brownian motion)

Three realizations of Bessel Processes.

== Formal definition ==
The Bessel process of order n is the real-valued process X given (when n ≥ 2) by

$$X_t = \| W_t \|,$$

where ||·|| denotes the Euclidean norm in R^{n} and W is an n-dimensional Wiener process (Brownian motion). Note that this SDE makes sense for any real parameter $n$ (although the drift term is singular at zero).

== Notation ==
A notation for the Bessel process of dimension n started at zero is BES_{0}(n).

== In specific dimensions ==
For n ≥ 2, the n-dimensional Wiener process started at the origin is transient from its starting point: with probability one, i.e., X_{t} > 0 for all t > 0. It is, however, neighbourhood-recurrent for n = 2, meaning that with probability 1, for any r > 0, there are arbitrarily large t with X_{t} < r; on the other hand, it is truly transient for n > 2, meaning that X_{t} ≥ r for all t sufficiently large.

For n ≤ 0, the Bessel process is usually started at points other than 0, since the drift to 0 is so strong that the process becomes stuck at 0 as soon as it hits 0.

=== Relationship with Brownian motion ===
0- and 2-dimensional Bessel processes are related to local times of Brownian motion via the Ray–Knight theorems.

The law of a Brownian motion near x-extrema is the law of a 3-dimensional Bessel process (theorem of Tanaka).
