= Markov operator =

In probability theory and ergodic theory, a Markov operator is an operator on a certain function space that conserves the mass (the so-called Markov property). If the underlying measurable space is topologically sufficiently rich enough, then the Markov operator admits a kernel representation. Markov operators can be linear or non-linear. Closely related to Markov operators is the Markov semigroup.

The definition of Markov operators is not entirely consistent in the literature. Markov operators are named after the Russian mathematician Andrey Markov.

== Definitions ==
=== Markov operator ===
Let $(E,\mathcal{F})$ be a measurable space and $V$ a set of real, measurable functions $f:(E,\mathcal{F})\to (\mathbb{R},\mathcal{B}(\mathbb{R}))$.

A linear operator $P$ on $V$ is a Markov operator if the following is true

1. $P$ maps bounded, measurable function on bounded, measurable functions.
2. Let $\mathbf{1}$ be the constant function $x\mapsto 1$, then $P(\mathbf{1})=\mathbf{1}$ holds. (conservation of mass / Markov property)
3. If $f\geq 0$ then $Pf\geq 0$. (conservation of positivity)

==== Alternative definitions ====
Some authors define the operators on the L^{p} spaces as $P:L^p(X)\to L^p(Y)$ and replace the first condition (bounded, measurable functions on such) with the property

$$\|Pf\|_Y = \|f\|_X,\quad \forall f\in L^p(X)$$

=== Markov semigroup ===
Let $\mathcal{P}=\{P_t\}_{t\geq 0}$ be a family of Markov operators defined on the set of bounded, measurables function on $(E,\mathcal{F})$. Then $\mathcal{P}$ is a Markov semigroup when the following is true

1. $P_0=\operatorname{Id}$.
2. $P_{t+s}=P_t\circ P_s$ for all $t,s\geq 0$.
3. There exist a σ-finite measure $\mu$ on $(E,\mathcal{F})$ that is invariant under $\mathcal{P}$, that means for all bounded, positive and measurable functions $f:E\to \mathbb{R}$ and every $t\geq 0$ the following holds

$$\int_E P_tf\mathrm{d}\mu =\int_E f\mathrm{d}\mu$$.

=== Dual semigroup ===
Each Markov semigroup $\mathcal{P}=\{P_t\}_{t\geq 0}$ induces a dual semigroup $(P^*_t)_{t\geq 0}$ through

$$\int_EP_tf\mathrm{d\mu} =\int_E f\mathrm{d}\left(P^*_t\mu\right).$$

If $\mu$ is invariant under $\mathcal{P}$ then $P^*_t\mu=\mu$.

=== Infinitesimal generator of the semigroup ===
Let $\{P_t\}_{t\geq 0}$ be a family of bounded, linear Markov operators on the Hilbert space $L^2(\mu)$, where $\mu$ is an invariant measure. The infinitesimal generator $L$ of the Markov semigroup $\mathcal{P}=\{P_t\}_{t\geq 0}$ is defined as

$$Lf=\lim\limits_{t\downarrow 0}\frac{P_t f-f}{t},$$

and the domain $D(L)$ is the $L^2(\mu)$-space of all such functions where this limit exists and is in $L^2(\mu)$ again.

$$D(L)=\left\{f\in L^2(\mu): \lim\limits_{t\downarrow 0}\frac{P_t f-f}{t}\text{ exists and is in } L^2(\mu)\right\}.$$

The carré du champ operator $\Gamma$ measures how far $L$ is from being a derivation.

=== Kernel representation of a Markov operator ===
A Markov operator $P_t$ has a kernel representation

$$(P_tf)(x)=\int_E f(y)p_t(x,\mathrm{d}y),\quad x\in E,$$

with respect to some probability kernel $p_t(x,A)$, if the underlying measurable space $(E,\mathcal{F})$ has the following sufficient topological properties:

1. Each probability measure $\mu:\mathcal{F}\times \mathcal{F}\to [0,1]$ can be decomposed as $\mu(\mathrm{d}x,\mathrm{d}y)=k(x,\mathrm{d}y)\mu_1(\mathrm{d}x)$, where $\mu_1$ is the projection onto the first component and $k(x,\mathrm{d}y)$ is a probability kernel.
2. There exist a countable family that generates the σ-algebra $\mathcal{F}$.

If one defines now a σ-finite measure on $(E,\mathcal{F})$ then it is possible to prove that every Markov operator $P$ admits such a kernel representation with respect to $k(x,\mathrm{d}y)$.

== Literature ==
- Bakry, Dominique; Gentil, Ivan; Ledoux, Michel. Analysis and Geometry of Markov Diffusion Operators. Springer Cham. doi:10.1007/978-3-319-00227-9.
- Eisner, Tanja; Farkas, Bálint; Haase, Markus; Nagel, Rainer (2015). "Markov Operators". Operator Theoretic Aspects of Ergodic Theory. Graduate Texts in Mathematics. Vol. 2727. Cham: Springer. doi:10.1007/978-3-319-16898-2.
- Wang, Fengyu (2006). Functional Inequalities Markov Semigroups and Spectral Theory. Ukraine: Elsevier Science.
