= Robert Liptser =

Russian-Israeli mathematician (1936–2019)

Professor Robert Sh. Liptser
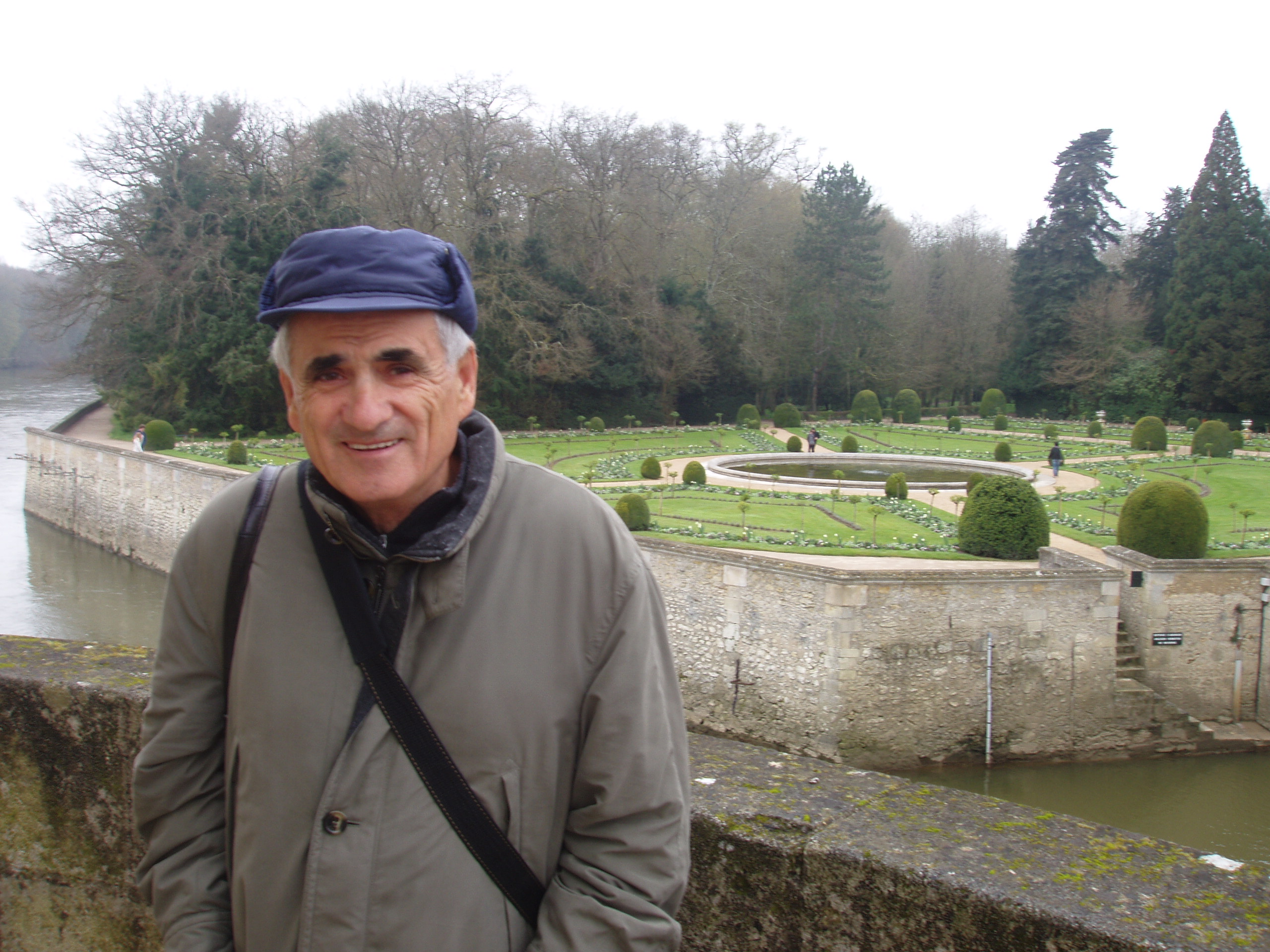
- Robert Liptser, in Château de Chenonceau, France, 25 March 2007
- Born: March 20, 1936; Kirovograd, Ukraine
- Died: January 2, 2019 (aged 82); Kfar Saba, Israel
- Scientific career
- Fields: Probability and Stochastic Processes
- Thesis: Filtering, smoothing and prediction of diffusion Markov processes from incomplete data
- Doctoral advisor: Albert Shiryaev

Robert Sh. Liptser (Russian: Роберт Шевилевич Липцер; Hebrew: רוברט ליפצר; 20 March 1936 – 2 January 2019) was a Russian-Israeli mathematician who made contributions to the theory and applications of stochastic processes, in particular to martingales, stochastic control and nonlinear filtering.

== Biography ==
Liptser was born in Kirovograd, Ukraine and spent his youth in Odesa, Ukraine. In 1959 he graduated with the M.Sc. degree in electrical engineering from Moscow Aviation Institute and in 1965 he graduated with the second M.Sc. in mathematics from Faculty of Mechanics and Mathematics of Moscow State University. In 1968 he obtained his Ph.D. degree from Moscow Institute of Physics and Technology (MIPT).

He held a Professor position at MIPT and worked in the Institute of Control Sciences until 1990, when he joined the Institute for Information Transmission Problems as the head of the Stochastic Dynamic Systems Laboratory.

In 1993 emigrated to Israel and lived in Kfar Saba. In Israel he held a Professor position at the School of Electrical Engineering in Tel Aviv University, until his retirement in 2005.

== Research ==
Liptser made several important contributions to the theory of martingales and to their applications in engineering and statistics. This includes his study of the conditionally Gaussian processes, which play an important role in the separation principle in stochastic control.

He coauthored a number of influential books. His monograph "Statistics of Random processes: General Theory and Applications", written together with Albert Shiryaev in 1974, has become an internationally renowned reference textbook among scholars working in stochastic analysis and related fields.
