= Alexander Novikov (mathematician) =

Soviet-Australian academic

Alexander Novikov is a professor Emeritus at the Department of Mathematical Sciences, University of Technology Sydney.

Prior to this current appointment in 1999 he was Leading Research Fellow at the Steklov Mathematical Institute (Moscow, since 1970) and Senior Lecture at the University of Newcastle (Australia, from 1996 to 1999).

Alexander was born in the Soviet Union, and currently lives in Australia. His research interest includes stochastic processes, statistics of random processes, sequential analysis, random fields, and mathematical finance. He is the author of Novikov's condition.

He received a PhD in Mathematics in 1972 and his Doctor of Science degree in 1982, both from the Steklov Mathematical Institute, with his thesis supervised by Albert Shiryaev. He has published more than 90 research papers.
