= Dmitry Kramkov =

Russian mathematician

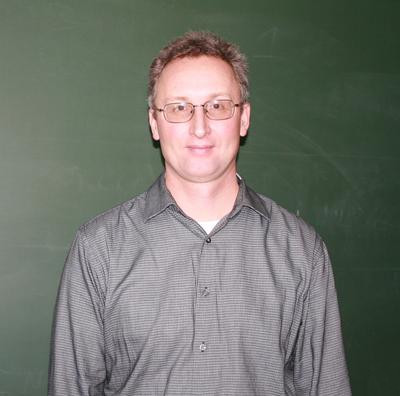
- Education: Steklov Institute of Mathematics
- Awards: EMS Prize (1996)
- Scientific career
- Fields: Mathematics
- Workplaces: Carnegie Mellon University
- Thesis: Toward the general theory of filtered statistical experiments (1992)
- Doctoral advisor: Albert Shiryaev

Dmitry Olegovich Kramkov (Russian: Дмитрий Олегович Крамков) is a Russian mathematician at Carnegie Mellon University. His research field are statistics and financial mathematics.

Kramkov obtained his doctorate from Steklov Institute of Mathematics in 1992, under supervision of Albert Shiryaev. In 1996 he was awarded an EMS Prize for his work in filtered statistical experiments.

Kramkov's optional decomposition theorem is named after him.
