= Shinzo Watanabe =

Japanese mathematician (born 1935)

Shinzō Watanabe
- 渡辺 信三
- Born: 23 December 1935 (age 90)
- Education: University of Kyoto
- Known for: Kunita-Watanabe decomposition; Kunita-Watanabe inequality; Generalized Wiener functionals
- Awards: Autumn Prize of the Japan Mathematical Society (1989); Japan Academy Prize (1996)
- Scientific career
- Fields: Stochastic analysis
- Workplaces: University of Kyoto Ritsumeikan University
- Doctoral advisor: Kiyosi Itô

Shinzō Watanabe (渡辺 信三 Watanabe Shinzō, born 23 December 1935) is a Japanese mathematician, who has made fundamental contributions to probability theory, stochastic processes and stochastic differential equations. He is revered as a luminary in the field of modern probability theory and stochastic calculus. The pioneering book “Stochastic Differential Equations and Diffusion Processes” he wrote with Nobuyuki Ikeda has attracted a lot of researchers into the area and is known as the “Ikeda-Watanabe” for researchers in the field of stochastic analysis. He serves as the editor of Springer Mathematics.

== Biography ==
Watanabe received his bachelor's degree from Kyoto University in 1958 and completed his Ph.D. under Kiyosi Itô in 1963. Watanabe subsequently became a professor at Kyoto University. After that, he moved to Ritsumeikan University and hold the full-time faculty position there until his retirement. He was also a visiting professor at Stanford University and participated in the organizing committees of international Japanese/Soviet seminars on probability theory. He has one daughter Shiori Watanabe.

== Scientific contributions ==
Watanabe has made many important contributions to stochastic analysis and the theory of stochastic processes. In an important work with H. Kunita, he extended K. Ito's theory of stochastic integration, initially developed by Ito for Markov processes, to square integrable martingales. This theory, known as the Kunita-Watanabe extension is based on the crucial Kunita–Watanabe inequality for the stochastic integral.

Another important contribution of Watanabe has been to use the Malliavin calculus to establish a theory of generalized functionals on Wiener space, by analogy to Laurent Schwartz's theory of distributions, and apply this theory to obtain expansions of heat kernels.

Watanabe also made important contributions to the study of multidimensional diffusion processes with boundary conditions and continuous-time branching processes.

== Awards and honours ==
In 1989 he received the Autumn Prize of the Mathematical Society of Japan.

In 1983 he was an invited speaker at the International Congress of Mathematicians in Warsaw (Excursion point processes and diffusion). In 1996 he received the Japan Academy Prize in Mathematics.

== Selected publications ==
- Ikeda, Noboyuki; Watanabe, Shinzo (1989) [1981]. Stochastic differential equations and diffusion processes (2nd ed.). North Holland. MR 1011252.
- with Toshio Yamada: Yamada, Toshio; Watanabe, Shinzo (1971). "On the uniqueness of solutions of stochastic differential equations". J. Math. Kyoto Univ. 11: 155–167. doi:10.1215/kjm/1250523691. MR 0278420.
- Watanabe, Shinzo (1969). "On two dimensional Markov processes with branching property". Trans. Amer. Math. Soc. 136: 447–461. doi:10.1090/s0002-9947-1969-0234531-1. MR 0234531.
- Watanabe, Shinzo (1968). "A limit theorem of branching processes and continuous state branching processes". J. Math. Kyoto Univ. 8: 141–167. doi:10.1215/kjm/1250524180. MR 0237008.
- Limit theorem for a class of branching processes, in: Markov processes potential theory, Proc. Symp. Univ. Wisconsin, Madison, 1967, 205-232
