= Albert Shiryaev =

Soviet and Russian mathematician (born 1934)

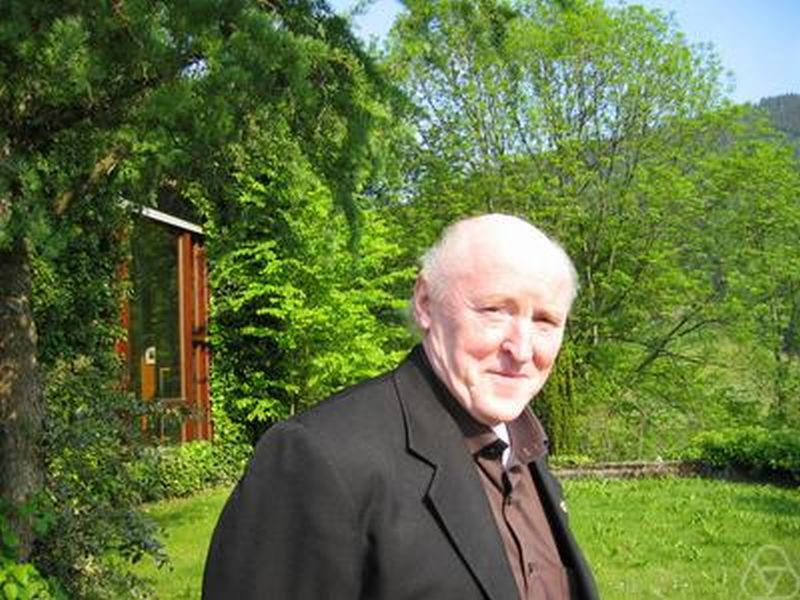
- Born: Albert Nikolaevich Shiryaev; October 12, 1934 (age 92); Shchyolkovo, Moscow Oblast, Russian SFSR, USSR
- Education: Moscow State University
- Known for: Probability theory
- Awards: Markov Prize (1974), Kolmogorov Prize (1994)
- Scientific career
- Fields: Mathematician
- Workplaces: Moscow State University; Steklov Institute of Mathematics; University of Manchester
- Doctoral advisor: Andrey Kolmogorov
- Doctoral students: Rober Liptser (1968); Dmitry Kramkov (1992); Ernesto Mordecki (1994); Alexander Novikov (1972); Boris Dmitrievich Gnedenko (2006)

Albert Nikolayevich Shiryaev (Russian: Альбе́рт Никола́евич Ширя́ев; born October 12, 1934) is a Soviet and Russian mathematician. He is known for his work in probability theory, statistics and financial mathematics.

== Career ==
He graduated from Moscow State University in 1957. From that time until now he has been working in Steklov Mathematical Institute. He earned his candidate degree in 1961 (Andrey Kolmogorov was his advisor) and a doctoral degree in 1967 for his work "On statistical sequential analysis". He is a professor of the department of mechanics and mathematics of Moscow State University, since 1971. As of 2007 Shiryaev holds a 20% permanent professorial position at the School of Mathematics, University of Manchester. He has supervised more than 50 doctoral dissertations and is the author or coauthor of more than 250 publications.

In 1970 he was an Invited Speaker with talk Sur les equations stochastiques aux dérivées partielles at the International Congress of Mathematicians (ICM) in Nice. In 1978 he was a Plenary Speaker with talk Absolute Continuity and Singularity of Probability Measures in Functional Spaces at the ICM in Helsinki.

He was elected in 1985 an honorary member of the Royal Statistical Society and in 1990 a member of Academia Europaea. From 1989 to 1991 he was the president of the Bernoulli Society for Mathematical Statistics and Probability. From 1994 to 1998 he was the president of the Russian Actuarial Society. In 1996 he was awarded a Humboldt Prize. He was elected a corresponding member of the Russian Academy of Sciences in 1997 and a full member in 2011. From 1998 to 1999 he was a founding member and the first president of the Bachelier Finance Society. He was made in 2000 Doctor Rerum Naturalium Honoris Causa of Albert Ludwigs University of Freiburg and in 2002 Professor Honoris Causa of the University of Amsterdam. In 2017 he was awarded the Chebyschev gold medal of the Russian Academy of Sciences.

== Contributions ==
His scientific work concerns different aspects of probability theory, statistics and its applications. He has contributions to:

- Nonlinear theory of stationary stochastic processes
- Problems of fast detection of random effects (Kolmogorov Prize of Russian Academy of Sciences, 1994)
- Problems of optimal nonlinear filtration, stochastic differential equations (A.N. Markov Prize of USSR Academy of Sciences, 1974)
- Problems of stochastic optimization, including "Optimal stopping rules"
- Problems of general stochastic theory and martingale theory
- Problems of stochastic finance (monograph "The Essentials of Stochastic Finance", English and Russian editions)

== Publications ==
- Optimal Stopping Rules. Springer-Verlag. 1978. ISBN 9783540740100.
  - Statistical sequential analysis: optimal stopping rules. American Mathematical Society 1976 (Russian 1969), new edition entitled Optimal Stopping Rules, Springer 1978, 2008
- with Robert Liptser: Statistics of random processes. 2 vols., Springer, 1977/1978, 1981; 2nd edition 2013, vol. 1
- with P. Greenwood: Contiguity and Statistical Invariance Principle. Gordon and Breach, 1985
- with R. Liptser: Theory of Martingales. Kluwer 1986; 2012 edition
- Probability (2nd ed.). Springer. 2013. ISBN 9781475725391; translated by R. P. Boas; 1st Russian edition 1980; 2nd Russian edition 1989, 2004
  - Wahrscheinlichkeit (= Hochschulbücher für Mathematik. vol. 91). Deutscher Verlag der Wissenschaften, Berlin 1988, ISBN 3-326-00195-9 (English: Probability, Springer 1984, 1996)
- with Jean Jacod: Limit Theorems for Stochastic Processes. Springer, 1994; 2nd edition 2013
- Essentials of Stochastic Finance: Facts, Models, Theory. World Scientific Publishing. 1999. ISBN 9789810236052.
- with V. Spokoiny: Statistical Experiments and Decision. World Scientific 2000
- with A. V. Bulinsky: Theory of Stochastic Processes. A course of lectures. Moscow 2003 (in Russian)
- From "Disorder" to Nonlinear Filtering and Martingale Theory. In: Bolibruch, Osipov, Sinai (eds.): Mathematical Events of the Twentieth Century. Springer 2006, pp. 371–397 (translated by R. Cooke) doi:10.1007/3-540-29462-7_18
- with Ole Barndorff-Nielsen: Change of Time and Change of Measure (2nd ed.). World Scientific Publishing. 2015. ISBN 9789814678605. 1st edition 2010
- Problems in Probability. Springer. 2016. ISBN 9783764324193.
