= Tanaka's formula =

Kind of differential equation

In the stochastic calculus, Tanaka's formula for the Brownian motion states that

$$|B_t| = \int_0^t \sgn(B_s)\, dB_s + L_t$$

where B_{t} is the standard Brownian motion, sgn denotes the sign function

$$\sgn (x) = \begin{cases} +1, & x > 0; \\0,& x=0  \\-1, & x < 0. \end{cases}$$

and L_{t} is its local time at 0 (the local time spent by B at 0 before time t) given by the L^{2}-limit

$$L_{t} = \lim_{\varepsilon \downarrow 0} \frac1{2 \varepsilon} | \{ s \in [0, t] | B_{s} \in (- \varepsilon, + \varepsilon) \} |.$$

One can also extend the formula to semimartingales.

== Properties ==
Tanaka's formula is the explicit Doob–Meyer decomposition of the submartingale |B_{t}| into the martingale part (the integral on the right-hand side, which is a Brownian motion), and a continuous increasing process (local time). It can also be seen as the analogue of Itō's lemma for the (nonsmooth) absolute value function $f(x)=|x|$, with $f'(x) = \sgn(x)$ and $f''(x) = 2\delta(x)$; see local time for a formal explanation of the Itō term.

== Outline of proof ==
The function |x| is not C^{2} in x at x = 0, so we cannot apply Itō's formula directly. But if we approximate it near zero (i.e. in [−ε, ε]) by parabolas

$$\frac{x^2}{2|\varepsilon|}+\frac{|\varepsilon|}{2}.$$

and use Itō's formula, we can then take the limit as ε → 0, leading to Tanaka's formula.
