= P-variation =

In mathematical analysis, p-variation is a collection of seminorms on functions from an ordered set to a metric space, indexed by a real number $p\geq 1$. p-variation is a measure of the regularity or smoothness of a function. Specifically, if $f:I\to(M,d)$, where $(M,d)$ is a metric space and I a totally ordered set, its p-variation is:

$\| f \|_{p\text{-var}} = \left(\sup_D\sum_{t_k\in D}d(f(t_k),f(t_{k-1}))^p\right)^{1/p}$

where D ranges over all finite partitions of the interval I.

The p variation of a function decreases with p. If f has finite p-variation and g is an α-Hölder continuous function, then $g\circ f$ has finite $\frac{p}{\alpha}$-variation.

The case when p is one is called total variation, and functions with a finite 1-variation are called bounded variation functions.

This concept should not be confused with the notion of p-th variation along a sequence of partitions, which is computed as a limit along a given sequence $(D_n)$ of time partitions:

$[ f ]_{p} = \left(\lim_{n\to\infty} \sum_{t^n_k\in D_n} d(f(t^n_k),f(t^n_{k-1}))^p\right)$

For example for p=2, this corresponds to the concept of quadratic variation, which is different from 2-variation.

== Link with Hölder norm ==
One can interpret the p-variation as a parameter-independent version of the Hölder norm, which also extends to discontinuous functions.

If f is α–Hölder continuous (i.e. its α–Hölder norm is finite) then its $\frac1{\alpha}$-variation is finite. Specifically, on an interval [a,b], $\| f \|_{\frac1\alpha\text{-var}}\le \| f \|_{\alpha}(b-a)^\alpha$.

If p is less than q then the space of functions of finite p-variation on a compact set is continuously embedded with norm 1 into those of finite q-variation. I.e. $\|f\|_{q\text{-var}}\le \|f\|_{p\text{-var}}$. However unlike the analogous situation with Hölder spaces the embedding is not compact. For example, consider the real functions on [0,1] given by $f_n(x)=x^n$. They are uniformly bounded in 1-variation and converge pointwise to a discontinuous function f but this not only is not a convergence in p-variation for any p but also is not uniform convergence.

== Application to Riemann–Stieltjes integration ==
If f and g are functions from [a, b] to $\mathbb{R}$ with no common discontinuities and with f having finite p-variation and g having finite q-variation, with $\frac1p+\frac1q>1$ then the Riemann–Stieltjes Integral

$$\int_a^b f(x) \, dg(x):=\lim_{|D|\to 0}\sum_{t_k\in D}f(t_k)[g(t_{k+1})-g({t_k})]$$

is well-defined. This integral is known as the Young integral because it comes from Young (1936). The value of this definite integral is bounded by the Young-Loève estimate as follows

$$\left|\int_a^b f(x) \, dg(x)-f(\xi)[g(b)-g(a)]\right|\le C\,\|f\|_{p\text{-var}}\|\,g\|_{q\text{-var}}$$

where C is a constant which only depends on p and q and ξ is any number between a and b. If f and g are continuous, the indefinite integral $F(w)=\int_a^w f(x) \, dg(x)$ is a continuous function with finite q-variation: If a ≤ s ≤ t ≤ b then $\|F\|_{q\text{-var};[s,t]}$, its q-variation on [s,t], is bounded by $C\|g\|_{q\text{-var};[s,t]}(\|f\|_{p\text{-var};[s,t]}+\|f\|_{\infty;[s,t]})\le2C\|g\|_{q\text{-var};[s,t]}(\|f\|_{p\text{-var};[a,b]}+f(a))$ where C is a constant which only depends on p and q.

== Differential equations driven by signals of finite p-variation, p < 2 ==
A function from $\mathbb{R}^{d}$ to e × d real matrices is called an $\mathbb{R}^{e}$-valued one-form on $\mathbb{R}^{d}$.

If f is a Lipschitz continuous $\mathbb{R}^{e}$-valued one-form on $\mathbb{R}^{d}$, and X is a continuous function from the interval [a, b] to $\mathbb{R}^{d}$ with finite p-variation with p less than 2, then the integral of f on X, $\int_a^b f(X(t))\,dX(t)$, can be calculated because each component of f(X(t)) will be a path of finite p-variation and the integral is a sum of finitely many Young integrals. It provides the solution to the equation $dY=f(X)\,dX$ driven by the path X.

More significantly, if f is a Lipschitz continuous $\mathbb{R}^{e}$-valued one-form on $\mathbb{R}^{e}$, and X is a continuous function from the interval [a, b] to $\mathbb{R}^{d}$ with finite p-variation with p less than 2, then Young integration is enough to establish the solution of the equation $dY=f(Y)\,dX$ driven by the path X.

== Differential equations driven by signals of finite p-variation, p ≥ 2 ==
The theory of rough paths generalises the Young integral and Young differential equations and makes heavy use of the concept of p-variation.

== For Brownian motion ==
p-variation should be contrasted with the quadratic variation which is used in stochastic analysis, which takes one stochastic process to another. In particular the definition of quadratic variation looks a bit like the definition of p-variation, when p has the value 2. Quadratic variation is defined as a limit as the partition gets finer, whereas p-variation is a supremum over all partitions. Thus the quadratic variation of a process could be smaller than its 2-variation. If W_{t} is a standard Brownian motion on [0, T], then with probability one its p-variation is infinite for $p\le2$ and finite otherwise. The quadratic variation of W is $[W]_T=T$.

== Computation of p-variation for discrete time series ==
For a discrete time series of observations X_{0},...,X_{N} it is straightforward to compute its p-variation with complexity of O(N^{2}). Here is an example C++ code using dynamic programming:

double p_var(const std::vector<double>& X, double p) {
	if (X.size() == 0)
		return 0.0;
	std::vector<double> cum_p_var(X.size(), 0.0);   // cumulative p-variation
	for (size_t n = 1; n < X.size(); n++) {
		for (size_t k = 0; k < n; k++) {
			cum_p_var[n] = std::max(cum_p_var[n], cum_p_var[k] + std::pow(std::abs(X[n] - X[k]), p));
		}
	}
	return std::pow(cum_p_var.back(), 1./p);
}

There exist much more efficient, but also more complicated, algorithms for $\mathbb{R}$-valued processes and for processes in arbitrary metric spaces.
