= Novikov's condition =

Condition in probability theory for stochastic processes

In probability theory, Novikov's condition is the sufficient condition for a stochastic process which takes the form of the Radon–Nikodym derivative in Girsanov's theorem to be a martingale. If satisfied together with other conditions, Girsanov's theorem may be applied to a Brownian motion stochastic process to change from the original measure to the new measure defined by the Radon–Nikodym derivative.

This condition was suggested and proved by Alexander Novikov. There are other results which may be used to show that the Radon–Nikodym derivative is a martingale, such as the more general criterion Kazamaki's condition, however Novikov's condition is the most well-known result.

Assume that $(X_t)_{0\leq t\leq T}$ is a real valued adapted process on the probability space $\left (\Omega, (\mathcal{F}_t), \mathbb{P}\right)$ and $(W_t)_{0\leq t\leq T}$ is an adapted Brownian motion:

If the condition

$$\mathbb{E}\left[e^{\frac12\int_0^T|X|_t^2\,dt}   \right]<\infty$$

is fulfilled then the process

$$\ \mathcal{E}\left( \int_0^t X_s \; dW_s \right) \ = e^{\int_0^t X_s\, dW_s  -\frac{1}{2}\int_0^t X_s^2\, ds},\quad 0\leq t\leq T$$

is a martingale under the probability measure $\mathbb{P}$ and the filtration $\mathcal{F}$. Here $\mathcal{E}$ denotes the Doléans-Dade exponential.
