= Igor Girsanov =

Russian mathematician (1934–1967)

Igor V. Girsanov
- Born: 10 September 1934; Turkestan, Kazakh ASSR
- Died: 16 March 1967 (aged 32); Sayan Mountains
- Education: Moscow State University
- Known for: Girsanov theorem
- Scientific career
- Fields: Mathematics

Igor Vladimirovich Girsanov (Russian: И́горь Влади́мирович Гирсанов; (10 September 1934 – 16 March 1967) was a Russian mathematician. He made major contributions to probability theory and its applications.

== Early life ==
Igor Girsanov was born on 10 September 1934, in Turkestan (then Kazakh ASSR). He studied in Baku until his family moved to Moscow in 1950. While at school he was an active member of the Moscow State University maths club and won multiple Moscow mathematics olympiads.

== Education ==
Between 1952 and 1960, Girsanov was an undergraduate and graduate student at Moscow State University. After his graduation he joined the faculty. In 1965 he became Head of the newly formed Probability and Statistics Laboratory at MSU.

== Academic work ==
One can distinguish two periods in Girsanov's academic work.

Prior to 1961, he worked as a member of a group of mathematicians united around E. B. Dynkin who were developing the theory of Markov processes. His thesis introduced the concept of a strong Feller process which proved to be particularly useful. In the same thesis he considered the problem of applying Markov processes to the solution of partial differential equations. He was among the first scientists to study elliptic and parabolic equations with discontinuous coefficients. In his papers on stochastic differential equations he determined the conditions when the discontinuity of the coefficients does not prevent the solution from being unique. He also produced important papers on the general theory of Markov processes.

Girsanov was able to learn areas of mathematics that were unfamiliar to him very quickly. At the same time he was considering questions unrelated to stochastic processes. For example, he constructed an example of a dynamical system with a simple spectrum. In collaboration with B. S. Mityagin he worked on quasi-invariant measures on topological linear spaces.

Around 1960 the problems of optimal management in industry and economics came to the fore in USSR. Many mathematicians were working in this area, mostly using familiar mathematical tools. Girsanov also started to work within this framework. But in 1961 he changed his approach. He began to develop a broader understanding of the issues at hand, developing new mathematical techniques.

Girsanov became an advocate of mathematical economics, actively defending it against the opponents of quantitative methods. His research results had applications in industry.

He published fifteen papers on applications to chemistry. His interests included the optimal control of chemical reactors.

He also maintained his interest in theoretical mathematics developing the functional analysis required for optimisation problems.

== Death ==
Girsanov died on 16 March 1967 at the age of 32 as a result of an accident during a hike in the Sayan Mountains.
