= Ernesto Mordecki =

Uruguayan mathematician and professor (born 1962)

- Born: Ernesto Mordecki Pupko; 6 October 1962 (age 63); Montevideo, Uruguay
- Occupations: mathematician, professor
- Website: Ernesto Mordecki

Ernesto Mordecki Pupko (born 6 October 1962) is a Uruguayan mathematician and professor.

== Biography ==
Mordecki is professor at the Centro de Matemática of the University of the Republic, Uruguay. He received his Ph.D. in statistics of stochastic processes in 1994 from the Steklov Mathematical Institute, under the supervision of Albert Shiryaev. His research interests include optimal stopping of stochastic processes and applications to finance. During 2000–2001 Mordecki was the director of the Centro de Matemática (Mathematics Center), Science Faculty, Montevideo.

Mordecki has authored more than 40 articles on his research interests.

In 2015 he was elected member of the Academy of Sciences of Uruguay
