= Yuan-Shih Chow =

Chinese-American mathematician (1924–2022)

- 周元燊
- Born: September 1, 1924; Xiangfan, Hubei Province, Republic of China
- Died: March 3, 2022 (aged 97); Hubei Province, China
- Education: National Chekiang University; University of Illinois Urbana-Champaign
- Known for: Optimal stopping
- Scientific career
- Fields: Statistics
- Institutions: National Taiwan University; IBM; Purdue University; Columbia University
- Thesis: The Theory of Martingales in an S-Finite Measure Space Indexed by Directed Sets (1958)
- Doctoral advisor: Joseph Leo Doob
- Other academic advisors: Abraham Taub

Yuan-Shih Chow (Chinese: 周元燊; pinyin: Zhōu Yuánshēn; 1 September 1924 – 3 March 2022), also known as Y. S. Chow or Zhou Yuanshen, was a Chinese and American mathematician and probabilist. He was a professor of statistics at Columbia University.

Chow served as director-general of the Institute of Mathematics at Academia Sinica and as director of the Center of Applied Statistics at Nankai University. He was an academician of the Academia Sinica.

== Life ==
Chow was born in Zhouwan Village, Zhangnan County, Xiangfan, Hubei Province, China. He entered the (National) Hechuan No. 2 Middle School (合川国立二中). But because of the Japanese invasion, he left his hometown and finished his high school education in Chongqing - the capital of China during the Second Sino-Japanese War. He became a student of the Department of Mathematics, National Chekiang University (now Zhejiang University) and he was a student of Su Buqing. About 1949, he went to Taiwan and taught Mathematics at the National Taiwan University in Taipei.

In July 1954, following the advice of Chung Tao Yang, Chow went to USA. He entered the University of Illinois and studied under the guidance of Joseph Leo Doob. In 1958, he received his PhD. After postdoctoral research with Abraham Taub at the University of Illinois, he became a staff member at the IBM Watson Research Laboratory and became a member of the research staff. Chow started teaching at Columbia University in 1961 as an assistant professor. From 1962 to 1968, he served in the Statistics Department, Purdue University, where he was promoted from associate professor to full professor. He returned to Columbia University in1968, where he was the Professor of Mathematical Statistics, and worked there until his retirement in 1993. During this period, Chow was also a visiting professor at different universities including the University of California at Berkeley, the National Central University in Taiwan, the University of Heidelberg in Germany. He was Professor Emeritus, Columbia University.

Chow died in Hubei province on 3 March 2022, at the age of 97.

== Membership ==
- Fellow, Institute of Mathematical Statistics (1966 election)
- Fellow, International Statistical Institute (1980 election)
- Academician, Academia Sinica (1974 election)

== Books by Yuan-Shih Chow ==
- Probability Theory: Independence, Interchangeability, Martingales, with Henry Teicher, 1978
- The Theory of Optimal Stopping, with Herbert Robbins and David Siegmund, 1971
