= Catherine Doléans-Dade =

French-American mathematician (1942-2004)

- Born: Catherine A. Doléans; 24 January 1942
- Died: 19 September 2004 (aged 62); Urbana, Illinois
- Education: University of Strasbourg
- Known for: Doléans measure Doléans-Dade exponential
- Spouse: Everett C. Dade
- Scientific career
- Fields: Mathematics
- Workplaces: University of Illinois at Urbana–Champaign
- Doctoral advisor: Paul-André Meyer

Catherine Doléans-Dade (24 January 1942 – 19 September 2004) was a French American mathematician. She made significant contributions to the calculus of martingales, including a general change of variables formula, a theorem on stochastic differential equations, and exponential processes of semimartingales.

After earning her doctorate from the University of Strasbourg in 1970, she became a professor in the Mathematics Department of the University of Illinois at Urbana–Champaign. She died of cancer in 2004.
