= Claude Dellacherie =

French mathematician (born 1943)

- Born: 1943 (age 82–83); Lauwin-Planque, France
- Alma mater: University of Strasbourg
- Known for: Research in probability theory
- Scientific career
- Fields: Mathematics
- Workplaces: University of Strasbourg; University of Rouen; French National Centre for Scientific Research
- Doctoral advisor: Paul-André Meyer

Claude Dellacherie (born 1943, Lauwin-Planque) is a French mathematician, specializing in probability theory.

Dellacherie received in 1970 from the University of Strasbourg his doctorate under Paul-André Meyer with thesis Contribution à la théorie générale des processus stochastiques.

In 1971/72 and 1978/79 he was at the Institute for Advanced Study. In 1978 he was an Invited Speaker of the ICM in Helsinki. From 1985 to 1996 he was the director of the Laboratoire Analyse et Modèles Stochastiques (URA CNRS 1378, which became UPRESA CNRS 6085) of the CNRS in Rouen. He was a professor at the University of Strasbourg and is now a professor at the University of Rouen.

== Selected publications ==
- with Paul-André Meyer: Probabilités et potentiel. 4 vols. Hermann, Paris 1975–1992; English translation, Probabilities and Potential. North Holland, 1978–1988
- Capacités et processus stochastiques (= Ergebnisse der Mathematik und ihrer Grenzgebiete, vol. 67). Springer Verlag, Berlin, Heidelberg, New York 1972, ISBN 3-540-05676-9
- Ensembles analytiques, capacités, mesures de Hausdorff (= Lecture Notes in Mathematics, vol. 295). Springer Verlag, Berlin, Heidelberg, New York 1972, ISBN 3-540-06076-6
- "Un survol de la théorie de l'intégrale stochastique." In Measure Theory Oberwolfach 1979, pp. 365–395. Springer, Berlin, Heidelberg, 1980. doi:10.1007/BFb0088238
