= Donald Burkholder =

American mathematician

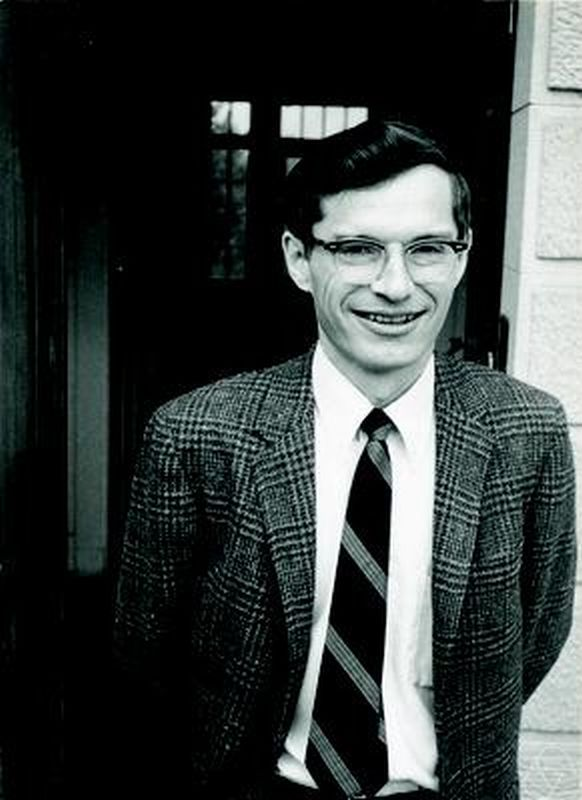
Donald Burkholder

Donald Lyman Burkholder (January 19, 1927 – April 14, 2013) was an American mathematician known for his contributions to probability theory, particularly the theory of martingales. The Burkholder–Davis–Gundy inequality is co-named after him. Burkholder spent most of his professional career as a professor in the Department of Mathematics of the University of Illinois at Urbana-Champaign. After his retirement in 1998, Donald Burkholder remained a professor emeritus in the Department of Mathematics of the University of Illinois at Urbana-Champaign and a CAS Professor Emeritus of Mathematics at the Center for Advanced Study, University of Illinois at Urbana-Champaign. He was a member of the U.S. National Academy of Sciences and a fellow of the American Mathematical Society. His son, J. Peter Burkholder, is Distinguished Professor Emeritus of Musicology at Indiana University Bloomington.

== Biographical data ==
Burkholder received a PhD in statistics in 1955 from the University of North Carolina at Chapel Hill, under the direction of Wassily Hoeffding. He was appointed an assistant professor in the Department of Mathematics at the University of Illinois at Urbana-Champaign in 1955 where he remained until his retirement in 1998. He was promoted to associate professor in 1960, became a professor in the department in 1964 and was appointed as professor at the Center for Advanced Study at UIUC in 1978.

Burkholder delivered an invited lecture at the International Congress of Mathematicians in 1970, a Wald Lecture at the Institute of Mathematical Statistics in 1971, a Mordell Lecture at Cambridge University in 1986, and a Zygmund Lecture at the University of Chicago in 1988.

Donald Burkholder was elected a member of the U.S. National Academy of Sciences in 1992. The same year he was elected a fellow of the American Academy of Arts and Sciences. On December 20, 2010, Burkholder was elected a Fellow of the American Association for the Advancement of Science for "distinguished contributions to probability theory, particularly the theory of martingales, and his work in stochastic processes, functional analysis, and Fourier analysis."

In 2009 Burkholder was named a SIAM Fellow by the Society for Industrial and Applied Mathematics "for advances in martingale transforms and applications of probabilistic methods in analysis".

Burkholder was an editor (1964–1967) of the journal Annals of Mathematical Statistics. He served as the president of the Institute of Mathematical Statistics in 1975–76. He is a Fellow of the Institute of Mathematical Statistics.

== Selected publications ==
- Burkholder, D. L.; Gundy, Richard F., Extrapolation and interpolation of quasi-linear operators on martingales. Acta Mathematica, vol. 124 (1970), pp. 249–304
- Burkholder, Donald L., Inequalities for operators on martingales. Actes du Congrès International des Mathématiciens (Nice, 1970), Tome 2, pp. 551–557. Gauthier-Villars, Paris, 1971.
- Burkholder, Donald L., Distribution function inequalities for martingales, Annals of Probability, vol. 1 (1973), pp. 19–42
- Burkholder, Donald L., A geometrical characterization of Banach spaces in which martingale difference sequences are unconditional. Annals of Probability, vol. 9 (1981), no. 6, pp. 997–1011
- Burkholder, Donald L., Explorations in martingale theory and its applications. École d'Été de Probabilités de Saint-Flour XIX-1989, pp. 1–66, Lecture Notes in Mathematics, vol. 1464, Springer-Verlag, Berlin, 1991

== See also ==
- Martingales
- Burkholder–Davis–Gundy inequality
