= Joseph L. Doob =

American mathematician (1910–2004)

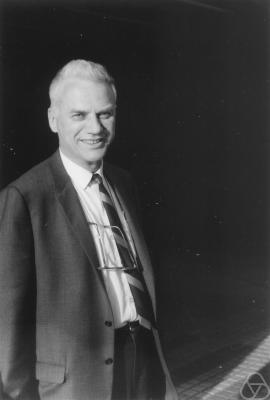
- Doob in Tokyo, 1969
- Born: February 27, 1910; Cincinnati, Ohio, U.S.
- Died: June 7, 2004 (aged 94); Urbana, Illinois, U.S.
- Education: Harvard University (BA, MA, PhD)
- Known for: Doob's martingale inequality Doob decomposition theorem
- Scientific career
- Fields: Mathematics
- Workplaces: University of Illinois at Urbana-Champaign
- Doctoral advisor: Joseph L. Walsh
- Doctoral students: Warren Ambrose; David Blackwell; Yuan-Shih Chow; Paul Halmos; J. Laurie Snell; Mary E. Thompson

Joseph Leo Doob (February 27, 1910 – June 7, 2004) was an American mathematician and one of the principal architects of modern measure-theoretic probability. Building on Kolmogorov's axiomatization of probability, he established a rigorous framework for continuous-parameter stochastic processes, developed martingale theory into a central method of probability, and pioneered probabilistic potential theory. His 1953 monograph Stochastic Processes became a foundational work in the development of modern probability theory.

== Early life and education ==
Doob was born in Cincinnati, Ohio, February 27, 1910, the son of a Jewish couple, Leo Doob and Mollie Doerfler Doob. The family moved to New York City before he was three years old. The parents felt that he was underachieving in grade school and placed him in the Ethical Culture School, from which he graduated in 1926. He then went on to Harvard where he received a BA in 1930, an MA in 1931, and a PhD (Boundary Values of Analytic Functions, advisor Joseph L. Walsh) in 1932. After postdoctoral research at Columbia and Princeton, he joined the department of mathematics of the University of Illinois in 1935 and served until his retirement in 1978. He was a member of the Urbana campus's Center for Advanced Study from its beginning in 1959. During the Second World War, he worked in Washington, D.C., and Guam as a civilian consultant to the Navy from 1942 to 1945; he was at the Institute for Advanced Study for the academic year 1941–1942 when Oswald Veblen approached him to work on mine warfare for the Navy.

== Work ==
Doob's thesis was on boundary values of analytic functions. He published two papers based on this thesis, which appeared in 1932 and 1933 in the Transactions of the American Mathematical Society. Doob returned to this subject many years later when he proved a probabilistic version of Fatou's boundary limit theorem for harmonic functions.

The Great Depression of 1929 was still going strong in the thirties and Doob could not find a job. B.O. Koopman at Columbia University suggested that statistician Harold Hotelling might have a grant that would permit Doob to work with him. Hotelling did, so the Depression led Doob to probability.

In 1933 Kolmogorov provided the first axiomatic foundation for the theory of probability. Thus a subject that had originated from intuitive ideas suggested by real life experiences and studied informally, suddenly became mathematics. Probability theory became measure theory with its own problems and terminology. Doob recognized that this would make it possible to give rigorous proofs for existing probability results, and he felt that the tools of measure theory would lead to new probability results.

Doob's approach to probability was evident in his first probability paper, in which he proved theorems related to the law of large numbers, using a probabilistic interpretation of Birkhoff's ergodic theorem. Then he used these theorems to give rigorous proofs of theorems proven by Fisher and Hotelling related to Fisher's maximum likelihood estimator for estimating a parameter of a distribution.

After writing a series of papers on the foundations of probability and stochastic processes including martingales, Markov processes, and stationary processes, Doob realized that there was a real need for a book showing what is known about the various types of stochastic processes, so he wrote the book Stochastic Processes. It was published in 1953 and soon became one of the most influential books in the development of modern probability theory.

Beyond this book, Doob is best known for his work on martingales and probabilistic potential theory. After he retired, Doob wrote a book of over 800 pages: Classical Potential Theory and Its Probabilistic Counterpart. The first half of this book deals with classical potential theory and the second half with probability theory, especially martingale theory. In writing this book, Doob shows that his two favorite subjects, martingales and potential theory, can be studied by the same mathematical tools.

The American Mathematical Society's Joseph L. Doob Prize, endowed in 2005 and awarded every three years for an outstanding mathematical book, is named in Doob's honor. The postdoctoral members of the department of mathematics of the University of Illinois are named J L Doob Research Assistant Professors.

== Honors ==
- President of the Institute of Mathematical Statistics in 1950.
- Elected to National Academy of Sciences 1957.
- President of the American Mathematical Society 1963–1964.
- Elected to American Academy of Arts and Sciences 1965.
- Associate of the French Academy of Sciences 1975.
- Awarded the National Medal of Science by the President of the United States Jimmy Carter 1979.
- Awarded the Steele Prize by the American Mathematical Society. 1984.

== Publications ==
Books

- — (1953). Stochastic Processes. John Wiley & Sons. ISBN 0-471-52369-0.
- — (1984). Classical Potential Theory and Its Probabilistic Counterpart. Berlin Heidelberg New York: Springer-Verlag. ISBN 3-540-41206-9.
- — (1993). Measure Theory. Berlin Heidelberg New York: Springer-Verlag.

Articles

- Doob, Joseph Leo (1934). "Stochastic Processes and Statistics". Proceedings of the National Academy of Sciences of the United States of America. 20 (6): 376–379. Bibcode:1934PNAS...20..376D. doi:10.1073/pnas.20.6.376. PMC 1076423. PMID 16587907. Zbl 0009.22101. Wikidata Q33740310.
- — (1934). "Probability and statistics". Transactions of the American Mathematical Society. 36 (4). American Mathematical Society: 759–775. doi:10.2307/1989822. JSTOR 1989822.
- — (1957). "Conditional brownian motion and the boundary limits of harmonic functions" (PDF). Bulletin de la Société Mathématique de France. 85: 431–458. doi:10.24033/bsmf.1494.
- — (1959). "A non probabilistic proof of the relative Fatou theorem" (PDF). Annales de l'Institut Fourier. 9: 293–300. doi:10.5802/aif.93.
- — (1962). "Boundary properties of functions with finite Dirichlet integrals" (PDF). Annales de l'Institut Fourier. 12: 573–621. doi:10.5802/aif.126.
- — (1963). "Limites angulaires et limites fines" (PDF). Annales de l'Institut Fourier. 13 (2): 395–415. doi:10.5802/aif.152.
- — (1965). "Some classical function theory theorems and their modern versions" (PDF). Annales de l'Institut Fourier. 15 (1): 113–135. doi:10.5802/aif.200.
- — (1967). "Erratum: Some classical function theory theorems and their modern versions" (PDF). Annales de l'Institut Fourier. 17 (1): 469. doi:10.5802/aif.264.
- — (1973). "Boundary approach filters for analytic functions" (PDF). Annales de l'Institut Fourier. 23 (3): 187–213. doi:10.5802/aif.476.
- — (1975). "Stochastic process measurability conditions" (PDF). Annales de l'Institut Fourier. 25 (3–4): 163–176. doi:10.5802/aif.577.

== See also ==
- Martingale (probability theory)
- Doob–Dynkin lemma
- Doob's h-transform
- Doob martingale
- Doob's martingale convergence theorems
- Doob's martingale inequality
- Doob–Meyer decomposition theorem
- Optional stopping theorem
