= Girsanov theorem =

Theorem on changes in stochastic processes

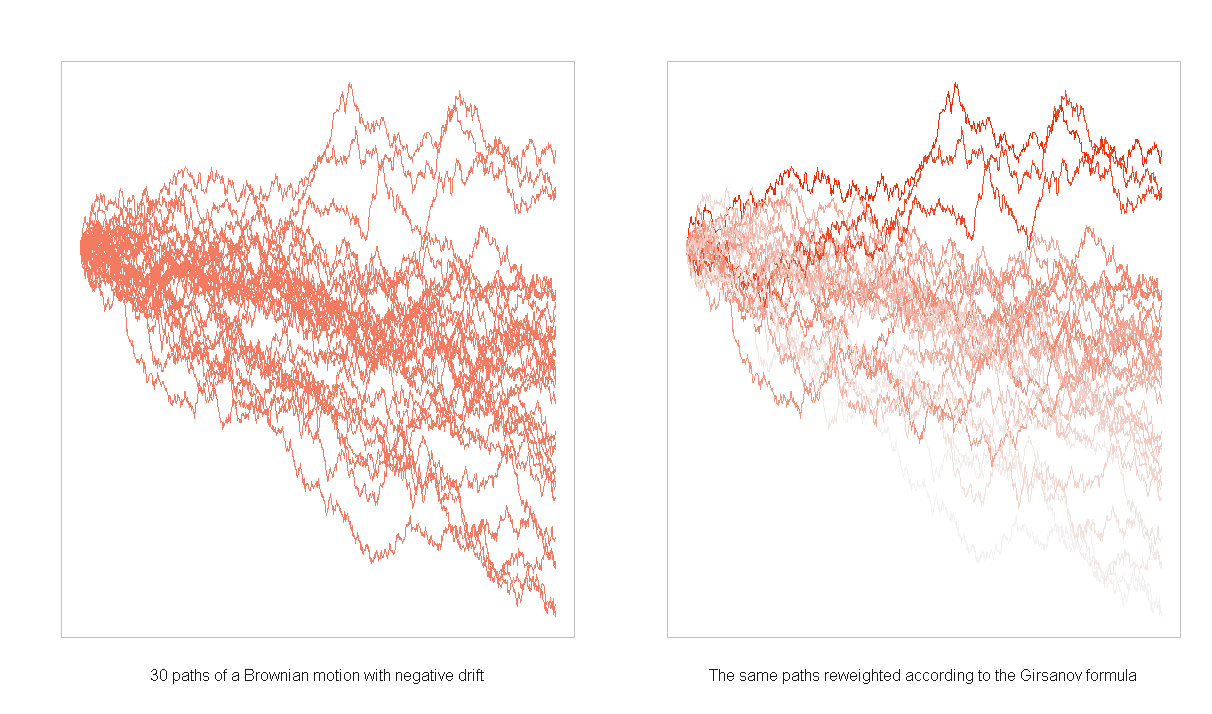
Visualisation of the Girsanov theorem. The left side shows a Wiener process with negative drift under a canonical measure P; on the right side each path of the process is colored according to its likelihood under the martingale measure Q. The density transformation from P to Q is given by the Girsanov theorem.

In probability theory, Girsanov's theorem or the Cameron-Martin-Girsanov theorem explains how stochastic processes change under changes in measure.

The theorem plays a significant role in the general theory of stochastic processes, where it provides the key result that if Q is a measure being absolutely continuous with respect to P, then every P-semimartingale is also a Q-semimartingale. It is also of great importance in the theory of financial mathematics as it explains how to convert from the physical measure, which describes the probability that an underlying instrument (such as a share price or interest rate) will take a particular value or values, to the risk-neutral measure which is a very useful tool for evaluating the value of derivatives on the underlying instrument.

== History ==
Results of this type were first proved by Robert Horton Cameron and W. T. Martin in the 1940s and by Igor Girsanov in 1960. They have been subsequently extended to more general classes of process culminating in the general form of Érik Lenglart (1977).

== Statement of theorem ==
Let $\{\Omega,\mathcal{F},P\}$ be a probability space, $\mathbb F=(\mathcal F_t)_{t\geq 0}$ be a filtration being complete and right-continuous (usual conditions) and $X$ be a continuous local martingale adapted to $\mathbb F$. Define

$$Z_t=\mathcal{E} (X)_t=\exp \left ( X_t - \frac{1}{2} [X]_t \right ),\,$$

where $\mathcal{E}(X)$ is the stochastic exponential of $X$ and $[X]$ denotes the quadratic variation of $X$.

If $Z$ is a martingale, then for any $T>0$ the measure

$$Q(A)=\int_AZ_T\,\mathrm dP, \qquad A\in\mathcal F_T,$$

is a probability measure on $\{\Omega,\mathcal{F}_T\}$ with Radon–Nikodym derivative

$$\left .\frac{\mathrm d Q}{\mathrm d P} \right|_{\mathcal{F}_T} = Z_T = \mathcal{E} (X )_T,$$

and, if $M$ is a continuous local martingale under $P$, then the process

$$\tilde M_t = M_t - \left[ M,X \right]_t, \quad t\in[0,T],$$

is a continuous local martingale under $Q$ with (respect to the filtration $\mathbb F$).

The statement remains true if $X$ and $M$ are merely càdlàg, that is, the paths are right-continuous and have left limits. Moreover, if $Z$ is uniformly integrable, then the statements holds true with $T=\infty$, since $Z_\infty=\lim_{t\to\infty}Z_t$ exists almost surely.

== Corollaries ==
=== Semimartingales ===
Any semimartingale $Y$ admits the decomposition $Y=M+A$ with a local martingale $M$ and a process of finite variation $A$. By Girsanov's theorem, if $\mathcal E(X)$ is a martingale, then the process

$$\tilde M_t = M_t-[M,X]_t$$

is a local martingale under the measure $Q=\mathcal E(X)\mathrm dP$ and, thus, $Y=\tilde M+A+[M,X]$ is a semimartingale under $Q$ as well, since $A+[M,X]$ is of finite variation.

=== Brownian motion ===
If $X$ is a continuous local martingale and $W$ is a Brownian motion under the measure $P$, then

$$\tilde W_t =W_t -  \left [ W, X \right]_t$$

is a Brownian motion under $Q$ (as defined above).

This follows from Levy's characterization of Brownian motion: The fact that $\tilde W_t$ is continuous is trivial, by Girsanov's theorem it is a $Q$ local martingale, and by computing

$$\left[\tilde W \right]_t= \left [ W \right]_t = t$$

it follows that this is a Brownian motion under $Q$.

In many common applications, the process $X$ is defined by

$$X_t = \int_0^t Y_s\, d W_s,\qquad t\in[0,T],$$

for a progressively measurable process $Y$ statisfying

$$\int_0^T Y_s^2\,\mathrm ds<\infty,\quad\text{ almost surely}.$$

For $X$ of this form, a sufficient condition for $\mathcal{E}(X)$ to be a martingale is Novikov's condition, which requires that

$$E_P\left [\exp\left (\frac{1}{2}\int_0^T Y_s^2\, ds\right )\right ] < \infty.$$

The stochastic exponential $\mathcal{E}(X)$ is the process $Z$ which solves the stochastic differential equation

$$Z_t = 1 + \int_0^t Z_s\, d X_s.\,$$

The measure $Q$ constructed above is not equivalent to $P$ on $\mathcal{F}_\infty$ as this would only be the case if the Radon–Nikodym derivative were a uniformly integrable martingale, which the exponential martingale described above is not. On the other hand, as long as Novikov's condition is satisfied the measures are equivalent on $\mathcal{F}_T$.

By the above theorem, the process

$$\tilde{W}_t=W_t-\int_0^tY_s\,ds,\quad t\in [0,T],$$

is a $Q-$Brownian motion. This was Igor Girsanov's original formulation of the above theorem.

== Applications ==
=== Finance ===
Consider a non-dividend-paying risky asset whose price under the physical measure $P$ follows the stochastic differential equation

$$\frac{dS_t}{S_t}=\mu_t\,dt+\sigma_t\,dW_t^P, \qquad \sigma_t>0,$$

where $\mu_t$ is the asset's drift, $\sigma_t$ is its instantaneous volatility, and $W^P$ is a Brownian motion under $P$. Let

$$\lambda_t=\frac{\mu_t-r_t}{\sigma_t},$$

where $r_t$ is the risk-free rate, and suppose that the associated stochastic exponential is a martingale. Define a new probability measure $Q$ by

$$\left.\frac{dQ}{dP}\right|_{\mathcal F_t}
=
\mathcal E\left(-\int_0^t\lambda_s\,dW_s^P\right).$$

Girsanov's theorem then implies that

$$W_t^Q=W_t^P+\int_0^t\lambda_s\,ds$$

is a Brownian motion under $Q$. Substitution into the asset-price equation gives

$$\frac{dS_t}{S_t}=r_t\,dt+\sigma_t\,dW_t^Q.$$

Thus, the change from the physical measure to the risk-neutral measure changes the asset's drift from $\mu_t$ to the risk-free rate $r_t$, while leaving the diffusion coefficient $\sigma_t$, or instantaneous volatility, unchanged.

This invariance concerns the diffusion coefficient within a specified model. It does not imply that estimates of historical volatility and implied volatility must be equal; those estimates may differ in practice.

Under $Q$, the discounted asset-price process is a martingale. In an arbitrage-free and complete market, such as the Black–Scholes-Merton model, the risk-neutral measure is unique, and the value at time $t$ of a contingent claim paying $H_T$ at time $T$ is

$$V_t =
E_Q\left[
\left.
\exp\left(-\int_t^T r_s\,ds\right)H_T
\right|\mathcal F_t
\right].$$

Girsanov's theorem provides the change of measure, while the uniqueness of the measure and the valuation formula depend on the model's no-arbitrage and completeness assumptions.

=== Langevin equations ===
Another application of this theorem, also given in the original paper of Igor Girsanov, is for stochastic differential equations. Specifically, let us consider the equation:

$$dX_t=h(X_t,t)dt+dW_t.$$

where $W_t$ denotes a Brownian motion. Here $h$ is a fixed deterministic function. We assume that this equation has a unique strong solution on $[0,T]$. In this case Girsanov's theorem may be used to compute functionals of $X_t$ directly in terms of a related functional for Brownian motion. More specifically, for any bounded or non-negative functional $\Phi$ on continuous functions $C([0,T])$, one has the Cameron–Martin formula

$$\mathbb{E} [\Phi(X)]=\mathbb{E} \left[ \Phi(W)\exp\left(\int_0^T h(W_s,s)dW_s-\frac{1}{2}\int_0^T h(W_s,s)^2ds\right)\right].$$

This follows by applying Girsanov's theorem, and the above observation, to the martingale process

$$Y_t=\int_0^t h(W_s,s)dW_s.$$

In particular, with the notation above, the process

$$\tilde{W}_t=W_t-\int_0^t h(W_s,s)ds$$

is a $Q$ Brownian motion. Rewriting this in differential notation as

$$dW_t=d\tilde{W}_t+ h(W_t,t)dt,$$

we see that the law of $W_t$ under $Q$ solves the equation defining $X_t$, as $\tilde{W}_t$ is a $Q$ Brownian motion. In particular, we see that the right-hand side may be written as $\mathbb{E}_Q[\Phi(W)]$, where $Q$ is the measure taken with respect to the process $Y$, so the result now is just the statement of Girsanov's theorem.

A more general form of this application is that if both

$dX_t=\mu(X_t,t)dt+\sigma(X_t,t)dW_t,$ $dY_t=(\mu(Y_t,t)+\nu(Y_t,t))dt+\sigma(Y_t,t)dW_t,$

admit unique strong solutions on $[0,T]$, then for any bounded functional on $C([0,T])$, we have that

$$\mathbb{E} [\Phi(X)]= \mathbb{E} \left[ \Phi(Y)\exp\left(-\int_0^T \frac{\nu(Y_s,s)}{\sigma(Y_s,s)}dW_s-\frac{1}{2}\int_0^T \frac{\nu(Y_s,s)^2}{\sigma(Y_s,s)^2}ds\right)\right].$$

=== Diffusion models ===
Girsanov's theorem has also been used for the convergence analysis of score-based diffusion models. In this setting, one goal is to evaluate the Kullback–Leibler divergence between the law (under $P$) of the true data generating process $(X_t)_{t\in[0,T]}$ given by

$$\mathrm dX_t = (-X_t-2\nabla\log p_t(X_t))\mathrm dt + \sqrt 2\mathrm dW_t, \qquad X_0\sim p_0,$$

where $p_t$ is the density of $\mathrm{Law}(X_t)$ with respect to the Lebesgue measure, and the learned process $(Y_t)_{t\in[0,T]}$ given by

$$\mathrm dY_t = (-Y_t-2s(t,Y_t))\mathrm dt + \sqrt 2\mathrm dW_t, \qquad Y_0\sim p_0,$$

with some function $s(t,\cdot)$ approximating $\nabla\log p_t$ for all $t\in[0,T]$. Under suitable conditions, by Girsanov's theorem, the process $\tilde W_t = W_t - \sqrt 2\int_0^t\big(\nabla\log p_u(X_u)-s(u,X_u)\big)\mathrm du$ is a Brownian motion under the measure

$$A\mapsto Q(A) = \int_A\mathcal E\left(\int_0^T\sqrt 2\big(\nabla\log p_t(X_t)-s(t,X_t)\big)\cdot\mathrm dW_t \right)\mathrm dP,$$

thus, the process $X$ under $Q$ has the same distribution as $Y$ under $P$. This leads to

$$P(Y\in B) = Q(X\in B) = \int_{\{X\in B\}} \mathcal E\left(\int_0^T\sqrt 2\big(\nabla\log p_t(X_t)-s(t,X_t)\big)\cdot\mathrm dW_t \right)\mathrm dP, \quad B\in\mathcal B\big(C([0,T])\big),$$

or, by denoting $P^X$ and $P^Y$ the laws of $X$ and $Y$ under $P$,

$$\frac{\mathrm dP^X}{\mathrm dP^Y} = \mathcal E\left(\int_0^T\sqrt 2\big(\nabla\log p_t(X_t)-s(t,X_t)\big)\cdot\mathrm dW_t \right)^{-1}.$$

This allows to conclude that

$$\mathrm{KL}(P^X\lVert P^Y) = \int \log \frac{\mathrm dP^X}{\mathrm dP^Y}\,dP^X = \mathbb E\Big[\int_0^T\lVert s(t,X_t)-\nabla\log p_t(X_t)\rVert^2\mathrm  dt\Big],$$

using the optional stopping theorem for the martingale term.

== See also ==
- Cameron–Martin theorem – Theorem describing translation of Gaussian measures on Hilbert spaces It is a special case of the Girsanov theorem who has inspired all the theory.
- Girsanov theorem has fundamental applications to the Quantum Field Theory, Malliavin Calculus, stochastic partial differential equations, degree theory, calculus of variations on the classical and abstract Wiener spaces.
