= Increasing process =

An increasing process is a stochastic process...

$$(X_t)_{t \in M}$$

...where the random variables $X_t$ which make up the process are increasing almost surely and adapted:

$$0=X_0 \leq X_{t_1} \leq \cdots .$$

A continuous increasing process is such a process where the set $M$ is continuous.

Consider a stochastic process $(\Chi_t)$ satisfying $X_t \leq X_s$ a.s. for all $t \leq s$ My question is: Does there exist a modification $\breve{X}$ of ,$X$ which almost surely has increasing sample paths $t \mapsto \breve{X}_t(\omega)$?
