= Doob–Meyer decomposition theorem =

Theorem in stochastic calculus

The Doob–Meyer decomposition theorem is a theorem in stochastic calculus stating the conditions under which a submartingale may be decomposed in a unique way as the sum of a martingale and an increasing predictable process. It is named for Joseph L. Doob and Paul-André Meyer.

== History ==
In 1953, Doob published the Doob decomposition theorem which gives a unique decomposition for certain discrete time martingales. He conjectured a continuous time version of the theorem and in two publications in 1962 and 1963 Paul-André Meyer proved such a theorem, which became known as the Doob-Meyer decomposition. In honor of Doob, Meyer used the term "class D" to refer to the class of supermartingales for which his unique decomposition theorem applied.

== Class D supermartingales ==
A càdlàg supermartingale $Z$ is of Class D if $Z_0=0$ and the collection

$$\{Z_T \mid T \text{ a finite-valued stopping time} \}$$

is uniformly integrable.

== Theorem ==
Let $(\Omega, \mathcal{F},(\mathcal{F}_t)_{t \ge 0}, \mathbb{P})$ be a filtered probability space satisfying the usual conditions (i.e. the filtration is right-continuous and complete; see Filtration (probability theory)). If $X = (X_t)_{t\ge0}$ is a right-continuous submartingale of class D, then there exist unique adapted processes $M$ and $A$ such that

$$X_t = M_t + A_t, \qquad t \ge 0,$$

where

- $M$ is a uniformly integrable martingale,
- $A$ is a predictable, right-continuous, increasing process with $A_0 = 0$.

The decomposition $(M, A)$ is unique up to indistinguishability.

Remark. For a class D supermartingale, the process A is integrable and of finite variation on bounded intervals.

== See also ==
- Doob decomposition theorem
