= Predictable process =

Stochastic process

In stochastic analysis, a part of the mathematical theory of probability, a predictable process is a stochastic process whose value is knowable at a prior time. The predictable processes form the smallest class that is closed under taking limits of sequences and contains all adapted left-continuous processes.

== Mathematical definition ==
=== Discrete-time process ===
Given a filtered probability space $(\Omega,\mathcal{F},(\mathcal{F}_n)_{n \in \mathbb{N}},\mathbb{P})$, then a stochastic process $(X_n)_{n \in \mathbb{N}}$ is predictable if $X_{n+1}$ is measurable with respect to the σ-algebra $\mathcal{F}_n$ for each n.

=== Continuous-time process ===
Given a filtered probability space $(\Omega,\mathcal{F},(\mathcal{F}_t)_{t \geq 0},\mathbb{P})$, then a continuous-time stochastic process $(X_t)_{t \geq 0}$ is predictable if $X$, considered as a mapping from $\Omega \times \mathbb{R}_{+}$, is measurable with respect to the σ-algebra generated by all left-continuous adapted processes. This σ-algebra is also called the predictable σ-algebra.

== Examples ==
- Every deterministic process is a predictable process.
- Every continuous-time adapted process that is left continuous is a predictable process.

== See also ==
- Adapted process
- Martingale
