= Minimum-distance estimation =

Method for fitting a statistical model to data

Minimum-distance estimation (MDE) is a conceptual method for fitting a statistical model to data, usually the empirical distribution. Often-used estimators such as ordinary least squares can be thought of as special cases of minimum-distance estimation.

While consistent and asymptotically normal, minimum-distance estimators are generally not statistically efficient when compared to maximum likelihood estimators, because they omit the Jacobian usually present in the likelihood function. This, however, substantially reduces the computational complexity of the optimization problem.

== Definition ==
Let $\displaystyle X_1,\ldots,X_n$ be an independent and identically distributed (iid) random sample from a population with distribution $F(x;\theta)\colon \theta\in\Theta$ and $\Theta\subseteq\mathbb{R}^k (k\geq 1)$.

Let $\displaystyle F_n(x)$ be the empirical distribution function based on the sample.

Let $\hat{\theta}$ be an estimator for $\displaystyle \theta$. Then $F(x;\hat{\theta})$ is an estimator for $\displaystyle F(x;\theta)$.

Let $d[\cdot,\cdot]$ be a functional returning some measure of "distance" between its two arguments. The functional $\displaystyle d$ is also called the criterion function.

If there exists a $\hat{\theta}\in\Theta$ such that $d[F(x;\hat{\theta}),F_n(x)]=\inf\{d[F(x;\theta),F_n(x)]; \theta\in\Theta\}$, then $\hat{\theta}$ is called the minimum-distance estimate of $\displaystyle \theta$.

(Drossos & Philippou 1980, p. 121)

== Statistics used in estimation ==
Most theoretical studies of minimum-distance estimation, and most applications, make use of "distance" measures which underlie already-established goodness of fit tests: the test statistic used in one of these tests is used as the distance measure to be minimised. Below are some examples of statistical tests that have been used for minimum-distance estimation.

=== Chi-square criterion ===
The chi-square test uses as its criterion the sum, over predefined groups, of the squared difference between the increases of the empirical distribution and the estimated distribution, weighted by the increase in the estimate for that group.

=== Cramér–von Mises criterion ===
The Cramér–von Mises criterion uses the integral of the squared difference between the empirical and the estimated distribution functions (Parr & Schucany 1980, p. 616).

=== Kolmogorov–Smirnov criterion ===
The Kolmogorov–Smirnov test uses the supremum of the absolute difference between the empirical and the estimated distribution functions (Parr & Schucany 1980, p. 616).

=== Anderson–Darling criterion ===
The Anderson–Darling test is similar to the Cramér–von Mises criterion except that the integral is of a weighted version of the squared difference, where the weighting relates the variance of the empirical distribution function (Parr & Schucany 1980, p. 616).

== Theoretical results ==
The theory of minimum-distance estimation is related to that for the asymptotic distribution of the corresponding statistical goodness of fit tests. Often the cases of the Cramér–von Mises criterion, the Kolmogorov–Smirnov test and the Anderson–Darling test are treated simultaneously by treating them as special cases of a more general formulation of a distance measure. Examples of the theoretical results that are available are: consistency of the parameter estimates; the asymptotic covariance matrices of the parameter estimates.

== See also ==
- Maximum likelihood estimation
- Maximum spacing estimation
