= Normality test =

Class of statistical tests

In statistics, normality tests are used to determine if a data set is well-modeled by a normal distribution and to compute how likely it is for a random variable underlying the data set to be normally distributed.

More precisely, the tests are a form of model selection, and can be interpreted several ways, depending on one's interpretations of probability:

- In descriptive statistics terms, one measures a goodness of fit of a normal model to the data – if the fit is poor then the data are not well modeled in that respect by a normal distribution, without making a judgment on any underlying variable.
- In frequentist statistics statistical hypothesis testing, data are tested against the null hypothesis that it is normally distributed.
- In Bayesian statistics, one does not "test normality" per se, but rather computes the likelihood that the data come from a normal distribution with given parameters μ,σ (for all μ,σ), and compares that with the likelihood that the data come from other distributions under consideration, most simply using a Bayes factor (giving the relative likelihood of seeing the data given different models), or more finely taking a prior distribution on possible models and parameters and computing a posterior distribution given the computed likelihoods.

A normality test is used to determine whether sample data has been drawn from a normally distributed population (within some tolerance). A number of statistical tests, such as the Student's t-test and the one-way and two-way analysis of variance (ANOVA), require a normally distributed sample population.

== Graphical methods ==
An informal approach to testing normality is to compare a histogram of the sample data to a normal probability curve. The empirical distribution of the data (the histogram) should be bell-shaped and resemble the normal distribution. This might be difficult to see if the sample is small. In this case one might proceed by regressing the data against the quantiles of a normal distribution with the same mean and variance as the sample. Lack of fit to the regression line suggests a departure from normality (see Anderson Darling coefficient and minitab).

Another graphical tool for assessing normality is the normal probability plot, a quantile-quantile plot (QQ plot) of the standardized data against the standard normal distribution. Here the correlation between the sample data and normal quantiles (a measure of the goodness of fit) measures how well the data are modeled by a normal distribution. For normal data the points plotted in the QQ plot should fall approximately on a straight line, indicating high positive correlation. These plots are easy to interpret and also have the benefit that outliers are easily identified.

== Back-of-the-envelope test ==
Simple back-of-the-envelope test takes the sample maximum and minimum and computes their z-score, or more properly t-statistic (number of sample standard deviations that a sample is above or below the sample mean), and compares it to the 68–95–99.7 rule: if one has a 3σ event (properly, a 3s event) and substantially fewer than 300 samples, or a 4s event and substantially fewer than 15,000 samples, then a normal distribution will understate the maximum magnitude of deviations in the sample data.

This test is useful in cases where one faces kurtosis risk – where large deviations matter – and has the benefit that it is very easy to compute and to communicate: non-statisticians can easily grasp that 6σ events are very rare in normal distributions.

== Frequentist tests ==
Tests of univariate normality include the following:

- D'Agostino's K-squared test,
- Jarque–Bera test,
- Anderson–Darling test,
- Cramér–von Mises criterion,
- Kolmogorov–Smirnov test: this test only works if the mean and the variance of the normal distribution are assumed known under the null hypothesis,
- Lilliefors test: based on the Kolmogorov–Smirnov test, adjusted for when also estimating the mean and variance from the data,
- Shapiro–Wilk test, and
- Pearson's chi-squared test.

A 2011 study concludes that Shapiro–Wilk has the best power for a given significance, followed closely by Anderson–Darling when comparing the Shapiro–Wilk, Kolmogorov–Smirnov, Lilliefors, and Anderson–Darling tests.

Some published works recommend the Jarque–Bera test, but the test has weakness. In particular, the test has low power for distributions with short tails, especially for bimodal distributions. Some authors have declined to include its results in their studies because of its poor overall performance.

Historically, the third and fourth standardized moments (skewness and kurtosis) were some of the earliest tests for normality. The Lin–Mudholkar test specifically targets asymmetric alternatives. The Jarque–Bera test is itself derived from skewness and kurtosis estimates. Mardia's multivariate skewness and kurtosis tests generalize the moment tests to the multivariate case. Other early test statistics include the ratio of the mean absolute deviation to the standard deviation and of the range to the standard deviation.

More recent tests of normality include the energy test (Székely and Rizzo) and the tests based on the empirical characteristic function (ECF) (e.g. Epps and Pulley, Henze–Zirkler, BHEP test). The energy and the ECF tests are powerful tests that apply for testing univariate or multivariate normality and are statistically consistent against general alternatives.

The normal distribution has the highest entropy of any distribution for a given standard deviation. There are a number of normality tests based on this property, the first attributable to Vasicek.

== Bayesian tests ==
Kullback–Leibler divergences between the whole posterior distributions of the slope and variance do not indicate non-normality. However, the ratio of expectations of these posteriors and the expectation of the ratios give similar results to the Shapiro–Wilk statistic except for very small samples, when non-informative priors are used.

Spiegelhalter suggests using a Bayes factor to compare normality with a different class of distributional alternatives. This approach has been extended by Farrell and Rogers-Stewart.

== Applications ==
One application of normality tests is to the residuals from a linear regression model. If they are not normally distributed, the residuals should not be used in Z tests or in any other tests derived from the normal distribution, such as t tests, F tests and chi-squared tests. If the residuals are not normally distributed, then the dependent variable or at least one explanatory variable may have the wrong functional form, or important variables may be missing, etc. Correcting one or more of these systematic errors may produce residuals that are normally distributed; in other words, non-normality of residuals is often a model deficiency rather than a data problem.

== See also ==
- Randomness test
- Seven-number summary
