= Nikolai Smirnov (mathematician) =

Nikolai Vasilyevich Smirnov
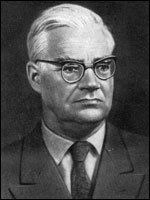
- Born: 17 October 1900; Moscow, Russian Empire
- Died: 2 June 1966 (aged 65); Moscow, Soviet Union
- Education: Moscow State University
- Known for: Kolmogorov–Smirnov test
- Awards: State Prize of the U.S.S.R., Order of the Red Banner of Labor
- Scientific career
- Fields: Mathematics
- Workplaces: Steklov Institute of Mathematics

Nikolai Vasilyevich Smirnov (Russian: Николай Васильевич Смирнов; 17 October 1900 – 2 June 1966) was a Soviet Russian mathematician noted for his work in various fields including probability theory and statistics.

Smirnov's principal works in mathematical statistics and probability theory were devoted to the investigation of limit distributions by means of the asymptotic behaviour of multiple integrals as the multiplicity is increased with limit. He was one of the creators of the nonparametric methods in mathematical statistics and of the theory of limit distributions of order statistics.

== Biography ==
Smirnov was born October 17, 1900, in Moscow into the family of a church clerk who was also employed as a clerk in the office of the Bolshoi Theater. He completed his gymnasium education during the First World War, during which he served in various medical units of the military.

After the October Revolution Smirnov joined the ranks of the Red Army. During this time he took an interest in philosophy and philology, which shaped his later interests in mathematics. It is suggested that Smirnov was influenced by the works of Velimir Khlebnikov, who had emphasized that the most fruitful results in arts and humanities could be achieved only after thoroughly understanding the natural sciences. According to the testimony of a friend, the artist S. P. Isakov, Smirnov, following this advice, entered Moscow State University after his discharge from the army in 1921 and focused his attention to the study of mathematics.

Smirnov graduated from the Faculty of Physics and Mathematics at Moscow State University, and, beginning in 1926, taught mathematics for many years at Timiryazev Agricultural Academy, Moscow City Pedagogical Institute, and Moscow State University. During this time, Smirnov narrowed his research foci to the fields of probability theory and mathematical statistics. Smirnov's initial period of research ended in 1938 with the defense of his doctoral dissertation "On approximation of the distribution laws of random variables" (Russian: Об аппроксимации законов распределения случайных величин), which served as the foundation for his work on nonparametric tests for which he was later renowned.

After his dissertation, Smirnov took up research with the Steklov Institute of Mathematics in 1938, where he worked for the remainder of his life. While at the institute he obtained new fundamental results in nonparametric statistics, and also studied the limit distributions of nonparametric criteria, the theory of large deviations, and the limit distributions for terms of variational series. For these series of works Smirnov was awarded the Stalin Prize in 1951. In 1957 he was made the Head of Mathematical Statistics at the Steklov Institute.

In 1960 Smirnov was elected to the Academy of Sciences of the Soviet Union as a corresponding member, in recognition for his contributions to the advancement of mathematical statistics.

Smirnov died on June 2, 1966. His sudden, unexpected death left him unable to complete his research in mathematical genetics, to which he had returned in the final years of his life with the intention to publish several works.

== Contributions to statistics ==
Together with Andrey Kolmogorov, Smirnov developed the Kolmogorov–Smirnov test and participated in the creation of the Cramér–von Mises–Smirnov criterion.

Smirnov made great efforts to popularize and widely disseminate methods of mathematical statistics in the natural sciences and engineering. In the 1950s, he was one of the first Soviet mathematicians to compile modern manuals on the use of statistics in engineering. His textbooks and manuals on the practical application of probabilistic and statistical methods were used in the USSR and abroad. Together with L. N. Bol'shev, Smirnov published a series of tables of various special functions most frequently used in probability theory and mathematical statistics, continuing the work started in the USSR by his colleague Eugen Slutsky, making important contributions to modern computational mathematics. In 1970, under the editorship of L. N. Bol'shev, selected works of Smirnov were published.

== Honours ==
Smirnov received the Stalin Prize in 1951, and in 1953 he was awarded the Order of the Red Banner of Labour.

== Notable works ==
- N. V. Smirnov and I. V. Dunin-Barkovskii, "Short Course of Mathematical Statistics for Technical Applications", Moscow, 1959.
- N. V. Smirnov, "Limit distributions for the terms of a variational series", Trudy Mat. Inst. Steklov., 25, Acad. Sci. USSR, Moscow–Leningrad, 1949.
- N. V. Smirnov, "Tables of the normal integrals of probabilities, normal densities and normalized derivatives", USSR Academy of Sciences Publishing House, Moscow, 1960.
- N. V. Smirnov and L.N. Bol'shev, "Tables of Mathematical Statistics", Nauka, Moscow, 1965
- N. V. Smirnov, "Probability and Mathematical Statistics: Selected Works", Nauka, Moscow, 1970.
