= Lilliefors test =

Statistical test for normality of data

Lilliefors test is a normality test based on the Kolmogorov–Smirnov test. It is used to test the null hypothesis that data come from a normally distributed population, when the null hypothesis does not specify which normal distribution; i.e., it does not specify the expected value and variance of the distribution. It is named after Hubert Lilliefors, professor of statistics at George Washington University.

A variant of the test can be used to test the null hypothesis that data come from an exponentially distributed population, when the null hypothesis does not specify which exponential distribution.

== The test ==
The test proceeds as follows:

1. First estimate the population mean and population variance based on the data.
2. Then find the maximum discrepancy between the empirical distribution function and the cumulative distribution function (CDF) of the normal distribution with the estimated mean and estimated variance. Just as in the Kolmogorov–Smirnov test, this will be the test statistic.
3. Finally, assess whether the maximum discrepancy is large enough to be statistically significant, thus requiring rejection of the null hypothesis. This is where this test becomes more complicated than the Kolmogorov–Smirnov test. Since the hypothesised CDF has been moved closer to the data by estimation based on those data, the maximum discrepancy has been made smaller than it would have been if the null hypothesis had singled out just one normal distribution. Thus the "null distribution" of the test statistic, i.e. its probability distribution assuming the null hypothesis is true, is stochastically smaller than the Kolmogorov–Smirnov distribution. This is the Lilliefors distribution. To date, tables for this distribution have been computed only by Monte Carlo methods.

In 1986 a corrected table of critical values for the test was published.

== See also ==
- Jarque–Bera test
- Shapiro–Wilk test
