= Minimum distance =

The term minimum distance may refer to

- Minimum distance estimation, a statistical method for fitting a model to data
- Closest pair of points problem, the algorithmic problem of finding two points that have the minimum distance among a larger set of points
- Euclidean distance, the minimum length of any curve between two points in the plane
- Shortest path problem, the minimum length of a path between two points in a graph
- The minimum distance of a block code in coding theory, the smallest Hamming distance between any two of its code words
