= Donald Allan Darling =

American statistician

- Born: May 4, 1915; Los Angeles, California, United States
- Died: June 24, 2014 (aged 99)
- Education: UCLA; Caltech
- Known for: Anderson–Darling test
- Scientific career
- Fields: Mathematical statistics
- Workplaces: Cornell University; Rutgers University; University of Michigan; University of California, Irvine
- Doctoral advisor: Morgan Ward
- Doctoral students: Frank Spitzer

Donald Allan Darling (May 4, 1915 – June 24, 2014) was an American statistician, known for the Anderson–Darling test.

Darling was born in 1915 in Los Angeles. In 1934 Darling began his undergraduate study at the University of California, Los Angeles, where he earned his undergraduate degree in mathematics in 1939. In 1940 he became a meteorologist at Pan American Airways and from 1942 to 1946, during World War II, he headed the statistics department of the Air Force Weather Research Project.

Meanwhile, in 1943 Darling enrolled as a graduate student at the California Institute of Technology, where in 1947 he received his PhD under Morgan Ward with thesis Continuous Stochastic Processes. Immediately afterwards, in 1947, he became a researcher at Cornell University, and in 1948 an assistant professor at Rutgers University. In 1949 he went to the University of Michigan, where later became a full professor. In 1952 Anderson and Darling published what is now known as the Anderson–Darling test, a statistical test that determines whether a given data sample fits a given probability distribution. In 2002 the University of Michigan created a professorship of statistics named in his honor. His doctoral students include Frank Spitzer.

In 1958–1959 he was a Guggenheim Fellow. From 1958 to 1961 he was associate editor of the Annals of Mathematical Statistics.

In 1967 he went to the University of California, Irvine, where he retired in 1982 as professor emeritus. He died on June 24, 2014.

== Selected works ==
- with Theodore Wilbur Anderson: Asymptotic theory of certain "goodness-of-fit" criteria based on stochastic processes. In: Annals of Mathematical Statistics. vol. 23, 1952, pp. 193–212.
- with Arnold J.F.Siegert: The First Passage Problem for a Continuous Markov Process. In: The Annals of Mathematical Statistics. vol. 24, no. 4, 1953
- On the Asymptotic Distribution of Watson's Statistic. In: Annals of Statistics. 1983
