= Morgan Ward =

American mathematician

Henry Morgan Ward
- Born: August 20, 1901; New York City, USA
- Died: June 26, 1963 (aged 61); Duarte, California, USA
- Education: University of California, Berkeley; Caltech
- Scientific career
- Workplaces: Caltech
- Doctoral advisor: Eric Temple Bell
- Doctoral students: Robert P. Dilworth; Donald Allan Darling

Henry Morgan Ward (August 20, 1901 – June 26, 1963) was an American mathematician, a professor of mathematics at the California Institute of Technology.

== Education and career ==
Ward was born in New York City. He studied at University of California, Berkeley, receiving his BA in 1924. He obtained his Ph.D. in mathematics from Caltech in 1928, with a dissertation titled The Foundations of General Arithmetic; his advisor was Eric Temple Bell. He became a research fellow at Caltech, and then in 1929 a member of the faculty; he remained at Caltech until his death in 1963. Among his doctoral students was Robert P. Dilworth, who also became a Caltech professor. Ward is the academic ancestor of over 500 mathematicians and computer scientists through Dilworth and another of his students, Donald A. Darling.

== Research ==
Ward's research interests included the study of recurrence relations and the divisibility properties of their solutions, diophantine equations including Euler's sum of powers conjecture and equations between monomials, abstract algebra, lattice theory and residuated lattices, functional equations and functional iteration, and numerical analysis. He also worked with the National Science Foundation on the reform of the elementary school mathematics curriculum, and with Clarence Ethel Hardgrove he wrote the textbook Modern Elementary Mathematics (Addison-Wesley, 1962).

Ward's works are collected in the Caltech library. A symposium in his memory was held at Caltech on November 21–22, 1963. Ward quasigroups are named after him, following his paper on alternative set of group axioms.

== Personal life ==
Ward died of a heart attack in Duarte, California.
