= Hubert Lilliefors =

American statistician (1928–2008)

Hubert Whitman Lilliefors (June 14, 1928 – February 23, 2008 in Bethesda, Maryland) was an American statistician, noted for his introduction of the Lilliefors test.

Lilliefors received a BA in mathematics from George Washington University in 1952 and his PhD at the George Washington University in 1964 under the supervision of Solomon Kullback. At the same university, he was a professor of statistics for 39 years. In the 1970s he participated in the randomizing process for the US military draft.

A memorial session in his honor was held at the Joint Statistical Meetings in August 2009 in Washington, D.C.
