= Variational series =

In statistics, a variational series is a non-decreasing sequence $X_{(1)} \leqslant X_{(2)} \leqslant \cdots \leqslant X_{(n-1)} \leqslant X_{(n)}$composed from an initial series of independent and identically distributed random variables $X_1,\ldots,X_n$. The members of the variational series form order statistics, which form the basis for nonparametric statistical methods.

$X_{(k)}$ is called the kth order statistic, while the values $X_{(1)}=\min_{1 \leq k \leq n}{X_k}$ and $X_{(n)}=\max_{1 \leq k \leq n}{X_k}$ (the 1st and $n$th order statistics, respectively) are referred to as the extremal terms. The sample range is given by $R_n = X_{(n)}-X_{(1)}$, and the sample median by $X_{(m+1)}$ when $n=2m+1$ is odd and $(X_{(m+1)} + X_{(m)})/2$ when $n=2m$ is even.

The variational series serves to construct the empirical distribution function $\hat{F}(x) = \mu(x)/n$ , where $\mu(x)$ is the number of members of the series which are less than $x$. The empirical distribution $\hat{F}(x)$ serves as an estimate of the true distribution $F(x)$ of the random variables$X_1,\ldots,X_n$, and according to the Glivenko–Cantelli theorem converges almost surely to $F(x)$.
