= Ana Justel =

Spanish statistician and Antarctic scientist

Ana María Justel Eusebio is a Spanish statistician and Antarctic scientist specializing in nonparametric statistics, including work on multivariate versions of the Kolmogorov–Smirnov test and on mixture models, and applications to the limnology and meteorology of Antarctica. She is a professor of statistics at the Autonomous University of Madrid.

== Education and career ==
Justel earned a licenciate in mathematics from the Complutense University of Madrid in 1990, and earned a doctorate in statistics and econometrics from Charles III University of Madrid in 1995, with the dissertation Algoritmos adaptativos de Gibbs Sampling para la identificación de heterogeneidad en regresión y series temporales.

After postdoctoral research at the Université catholique de Louvain, she joined the staff at the Autonomous University of Madrid in 1996; her position there was made permanent in 2000.

== Recognition ==
Justel won the inaugural Margarita Salas Prize of the Talent Woman initiative, in 2019.
