= Shapiro–Wilk test =

Test of normality in frequentist statistics

The Shapiro–Wilk test is a test of normality. It was published in 1965 by Samuel Sanford Shapiro and Martin Wilk.

== Theory ==
The Shapiro–Wilk test tests the null hypothesis that a sample x_{1}, ..., x_{n} came from a normally distributed population. The test statistic is

$$W = \frac{{\left(\sum\limits_{i=1}^n a_i x_{(i)}\right)}^2}{\sum\limits_{i=1}^n {\left(x_i-\overline{x}\right)}^2},$$

where

- $x_{(i)}$ with parentheses enclosing the subscript index i is the ith order statistic, i.e., the ith-smallest number in the sample (not to be confused with $x_i$).
- $\overline{x} = \left( x_1 + \cdots + x_n \right) / n$ is the sample mean.

The coefficients $a_i$ are given by:
$$(a_1,\dots,a_n) = {m^{\mathsf{T}} V^{-1} \over C},$$
where C is a vector norm:
$$C = \left\| V^{-1} m \right\| = {\left(m^{\mathsf{T}} V^{-1} V^{-1} m\right)}^{1/2}$$
and the vector m,
$$m = (m_1,\dots,m_n)^{\mathsf{T}}$$
is made of the expected values of the order statistics of independent and identically distributed random variables sampled from the standard normal distribution; finally, $V$ is the covariance matrix of those normal order statistics.

There is no name for the distribution of $W$. The cutoff values for the statistics are calculated through Monte Carlo simulations.

== Interpretation ==
The null-hypothesis of this test is that the population is normally distributed. If the p value is less than the chosen alpha level, then the null hypothesis is rejected and there is evidence that the data tested are not normally distributed.

Like most statistical significance tests, if the sample size is sufficiently large this test may detect even trivial departures from the null hypothesis (i.e., although there may be some statistically significant effect, it may be too small to be of any practical significance); thus, additional investigation of the effect size is typically advisable, e.g., a Q–Q plot in this case.

== Power analysis ==
Monte Carlo simulations have demonstrated in practically relevant settings that Shapiro–Wilk has the best power for a given significance, followed closely by Anderson–Darling when comparing the Shapiro–Wilk, Kolmogorov–Smirnov, and Lilliefors.

== Approximation ==
The main bottleneck in the use of this method for higher sample sizes lies in the calculation of the coefficients vector a, more specifically in the size of V which requires the storage of n + n(n + 1)/2 numbers at minimum. The original 1965 publication included values of V up to n = 50 for this purpose (though the values for n ≤ 20 was incorrect). Another issue is the requirement for a precalculated set of cutoffs for W at a given n and alpha-level. It is also known that the Shapiro–Francia test is asymptotically equivalent, but it is not close enough at practical n.

In 1982 Royston provided a more correct method of calculating m and a lognormal approximation of W up to n = 2000, which could be used with an existing approximation of V, but the quadratic limitation on V remained. In 1991, Royston published a polynomial fit for $a_n-c_n$, where $c_i=\left(\tilde{m}^\intercal \tilde{m}\right)^{-1/2} \tilde{m}_i$ and $\tilde{m}_i = \Phi^{-1}\left[(i-\frac{3}{8})/(n+{1}{4})\right]$ (Welsberg–Bingham statistic, an approximation of Shapiro-Francia) up to n = 1000. Combined with lognormal fits for W given $\tilde{a}$, it appears to work well at n = 5000 by comparison with published critical points. The 1991 technique is used in several software packages including GraphPad Prism, Stata, SPSS, and SAS.

Rahman and Govidarajulu provided an approximation of W up to n = 5000, though they appear unaware of Royston's 1991 work.

== See also ==
- Anderson–Darling test
- Cramér–von Mises criterion
- D'Agostino's K-squared test
- Kolmogorov–Smirnov test
- Lilliefors test
- Normal probability plot
