= Angeliki Diane Rigos =

- Education: Cornell University; Northeastern University; Massachusetts Institute of Technology
- Known for: Brownian dynamics simulations Protein and Co-polymer Aggregation Theory; Corrosion studies
- Scientific career
- Fields: Physical Chemistry
- Workplaces: Massachusetts Institute of Technology

Angeliki Artemis Diane Rigos is a research director, a business consultant, and a former university professor. Rigos is primarily known for her work on Brownian dynamics simulations and theories of protein and co-polymer aggregation, as well as for the considerable amount of work she has done on the processing of military waste.

== Biography ==
Rigos attained a BA in Chemistry from Cornell University in 1979, after which she moved on to do her PhD in Physical Chemistry at the Massachusetts Institute of Technology in 1985. Rigos then moved into an industrial position as the principal scientist at Physical Sciences, Inc., a position she held until her appointment to the post of associate professor at Merrimack College in 1988, eventually earning a promotion to Chair of Chemistry and Biochemistry in 2012.

While at Merrimack, Rigos served as a visiting scientist at Harvard University, Northeastern University, and the Massachusetts Institute of Technology. She also completed an MBA at Northeastern University and became an Executive Consultant at Levitan & Associates, Inc, and volunteered as an Industry Champion at MassChallenge and as a mentor at Cleantech Open.

Rigos ultimately left Merrimack College in 2016 and became the executive director of the Tata Center at the Massachusetts Institute of Technology. She has since become involved in various organizations promoting women in science, including the Association for Women in Science, whose Massachusetts division she serves as vice president.

== Select publications ==
- Fields, Gregg B.; Alonso, Darwin O. V.; Stigter, Dirk; Dill, Ken A. (May 1992). "Theory for the aggregation of proteins and copolymers". The Journal of Physical Chemistry. 96 (10): 3974–3981. doi:10.1021/j100189a013. ISSN 0022-3654.
- Rigos, Angeliki Artemis; Wilemski, Gerald (May 1992). "Brownian dynamics simulations of an order-disorder transition in sheared sterically stabilized colloidal suspensions". The Journal of Physical Chemistry. 96 (10): 3981–3986. doi:10.1021/j100189a014. ISSN 0022-3654.
- Cline, Jason A.; Rigos, Angeliki A.; Arias, Tomás A. (July 2000). "Ab Initio Study of Magnetic Structure and Chemical Reactivity of Cr 2 O 3 and Its (0001) Surface". The Journal of Physical Chemistry B. 104 (26): 6195–6201. arXiv:cond-mat/9912154. doi:10.1021/jp9943474. ISSN 1520-6106. S2CID 93282089.
- Rigos, Angeliki A.; Salemme, Kevin (June 1999). "Photochemistry and Pinhole Photography: An Interdisciplinary Experiment". Journal of Chemical Education. 76 (6): 736A. Bibcode:1999JChEd..76..736R. doi:10.1021/ed076p736A. ISSN 0021-9584.
