= Single file =

Single file may refer to:

- The Single File, a 1983 video compilation and 1984 box-set album by English singer-songwriter Kate Bush
- "Single File", a song from the 1995 album Elliott Smith by American singer-songwriter Elliott Smith
- Single File (album), the 2000 début album by American punk-rock band The Honor System
- Single File (band), an American pop-punk, alternative-rock band
- Single-file dynamics, another term for file dynamics, the occurrence and motion of particles in a channel in chemistry, physics, mathematics and related fields
- Single file (formation), a military term for a single column (formation) of troops
