= Gisiro Maruyama =

Japanese mathematician

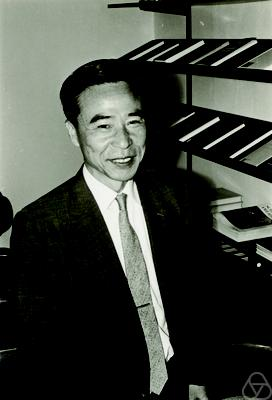
Gisiro Maruyama

Gisiro Maruyama (丸山 儀四郎, Maruyama Gishirō; April 4, 1916 – July 5, 1986) was a Japanese mathematician, noted for his contributions to the study of stochastic processes. The Euler–Maruyama method for the numerical solution of stochastic differential equations bears his name.

Maruyama was born in 1916 and graduated from Tohoku University, where he studied Fourier analysis and physics. He began his mathematical work with a paper on Fourier analysis in 1939. He became interested in probability theory through the study of Norbert Wiener's work. He was appointed Assistant professor at the Kyushu University in 1941.

When Kiyosi Itô published his papers on stochastic differential equations in 1942, Maruyama immediately recognized the importance of this work and soon published a series of papers on stochastic differential equations and Markov processes. Maruyama is known in particular for his 1955 study of the convergence properties of the finite-difference approximations for the numerical solution of stochastic differential equations, now known as the Euler–Maruyama method. In harmonic analysis, he studied the ergodicity and mixing properties of stationary stochastic processes in terms of their spectral properties. Maruyama also studied quasi-invariance properties of the Wiener measure, extending previous work by Cameron and Martin to diffusion processes.
