= Dynamics (mechanics) =

Study of forces and their effect on motion

In physics, dynamics or classical dynamics is the study of forces and their effect on motion. It is a branch of classical mechanics, along with statics and kinematics. The fundamental principle of dynamics is linked to Newton's second law.

== Subdivisions ==
=== Rigid bodies ===
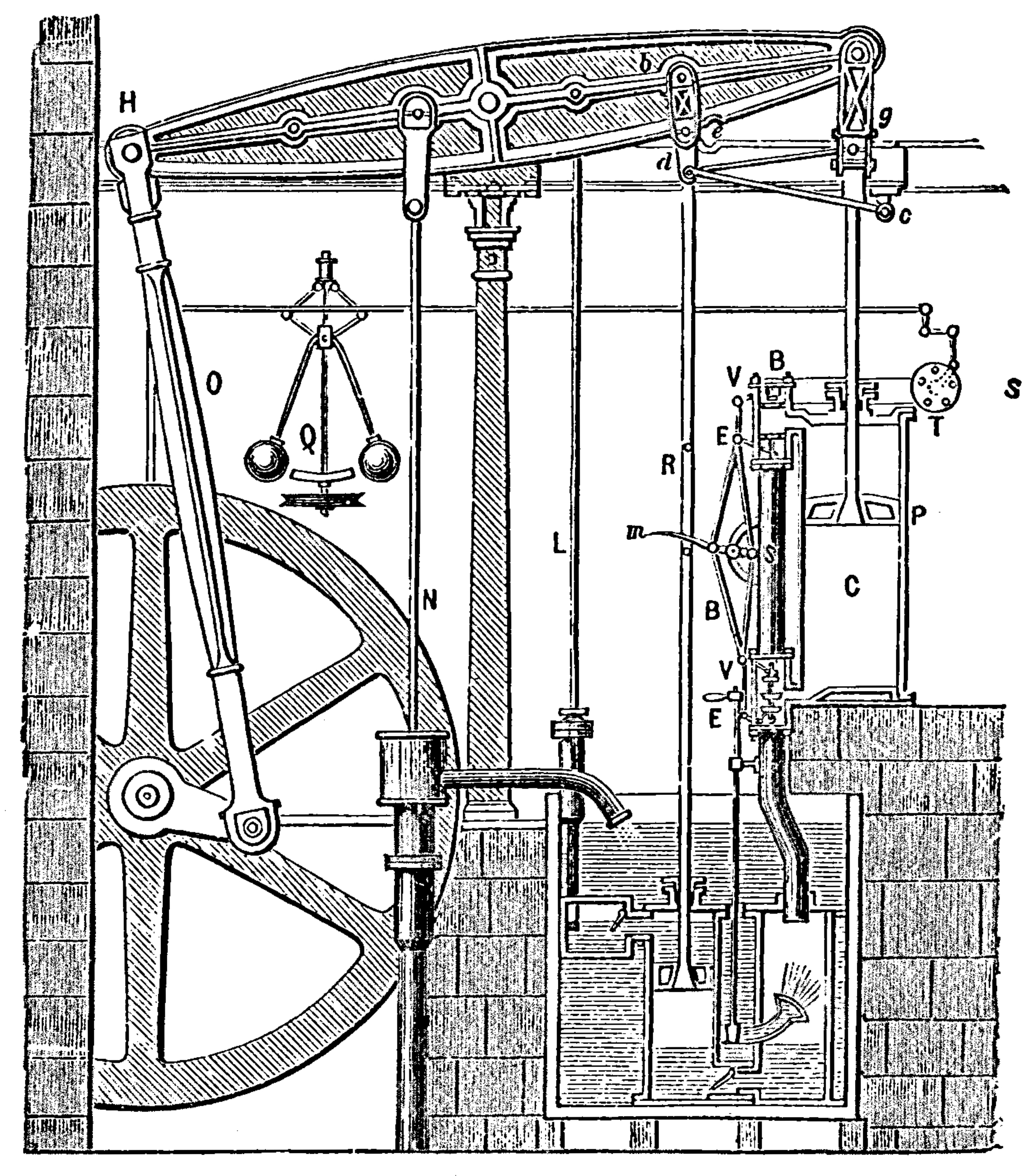
Movement of each of the components of the Boulton & Watt Steam Engine (1784) can be described by a set of equations of kinematics and kinetics.

In classical mechanics, rigid body dynamics studies the movement of systems of interconnected bodies under the action of external forces. Along with statics, it forms the field of rigid body mechanics. The assumption that the bodies are rigid (i.e. they do not deform under the action of applied forces) simplifies analysis, by reducing the parameters that describe the configuration of the system to the translation and rotation of body-fixed frames. This excludes bodies that display fluid, highly elastic, and plastic behavior.

The dynamics of a rigid body system is described by the laws of kinematics and by the application of Newton's second law (kinetics) or their derivative form, Lagrangian mechanics. The solution of these equations of motion provides a description of the position, the motion and the acceleration of the individual components of the system, and overall the system itself, as a function of time. The formulation and solution of rigid body dynamics is an important tool in the computer simulation of mechanical systems.

=== Fluids ===
Computer generated animation of fluid in a tube flowing past a cylinder, showing the shedding of a series of vortices in the flow behind it, called a von Kármán vortex street. The streamlines show the direction of the fluid flow, and the color gradient shows the pressure at each point, from blue to green, yellow, and red indicating increasing pressure

In physics, physical chemistry, and engineering, fluid dynamics is a subdiscipline of fluid mechanics that describes the flow of fluids – liquids and gases. It has several subdisciplines, including aerodynamics (the study of air and other gases in motion) and hydrodynamics (the study of water and other liquids in motion). Fluid dynamics has a wide range of applications, including calculating forces and moments on aircraft, determining the mass flow rate of petroleum through pipelines, predicting weather patterns, understanding nebulae in interstellar space, understanding large scale geophysical flows involving oceans/atmosphere and modelling fission weapon detonation.

Fluid dynamics offers a systematic structure—which underlies these practical disciplines—that embraces empirical and semi-empirical laws derived from flow measurement and used to solve practical problems. The solution to a fluid dynamics problem typically involves the calculation of various properties of the fluid, such as flow velocity, pressure, density, and temperature, as functions of space and time.

Before the twentieth century, "hydrodynamics" was synonymous with fluid dynamics. This is still reflected in names of some fluid dynamics topics, like magnetohydrodynamics and hydrodynamic stability, both of which can also be applied to gases.

== Applications ==
Classical dynamics finds many applications:

- Aerodynamics, the study of the motion of air
- Brownian dynamics, the occurrence of Langevin dynamics in the motion of particles in solution
- File dynamics, stochastic motion of particles in a channel
- Flight dynamics, the science of aircraft and spacecraft design
- Molecular dynamics, the study of motion on the molecular level
- Langevin dynamics, a mathematical model for stochastic dynamics
- Orbital dynamics, the study of the motion of rockets and spacecraft
- Stellar dynamics, a description of the collective motion of stars
- Vehicle dynamics, the study of vehicles in motion

== Generalizations ==
Non-classical dynamics include:

- System dynamics, the study of the behavior of complex systems
- Quantum dynamics analogue of classical dynamics in a quantum physics context
- Quantum chromodynamics, a theory of the strong interaction (color force)
- Quantum electrodynamics, a description of how matter and light interact
- Relativistic dynamics, a combination of relativistic and quantum concepts
- Thermodynamics, the study of the relationships between heat and mechanical energy

== See also ==
- Analytical dynamics
- Ballistics
- Contact dynamics
- Dynamical simulation
- Kinetics (physics)
- Multibody dynamics
- n-body problem
- Newtonian dynamics
