= Brownian dynamics =

Ideal molecular motion where no average acceleration takes place

In physics, Brownian dynamics is a mathematical approach for describing the dynamics of molecular systems in the diffusive regime. It is a simplified version of Langevin dynamics and corresponds to the limit where no average acceleration takes place. This approximation is also known as overdamped Langevin dynamics or as Langevin dynamics without inertia.

== Definition ==
In Brownian dynamics, the following equation of motion is used to describe the dynamics of a stochastic system with coordinates $X=X(t)$:

$$\dot{X} = - \frac{D}{k_\text{B} T} \nabla U(X) + \sqrt{2 D} R(t).$$

where:

- $\dot{X}$ is the velocity, the dot being a time derivative
- $U(X)$ is the particle interaction potential
- $\nabla$ is the gradient operator, such that $- \nabla U(X)$ is the force calculated from the particle interaction potential
- $k_\text{B}$ is the Boltzmann constant
- $T$ is the temperature
- $D$ is a diffusion coefficient
- $R(t)$ is a white noise term, satisfying $\left\langle R(t) \right\rangle =0$ and $\left\langle R(t)R(t') \right\rangle = \delta(t-t')$

== Derivation ==
In Langevin dynamics, the equation of motion using the same notation as above is as follows:
$$M\ddot{X} = - \nabla U(X) - \zeta \dot{X} + \sqrt{2 \zeta k_\text{B} T} R(t)$$
where:

- $M$ is the mass of the particle.
- $\ddot{X}$ is the acceleration
- $\zeta$ is the friction constant or tensor, in units of $\text{mass} / \text{time}$.
  - It is often of form $\zeta=\gamma M$, where $\gamma$ is the collision frequency with the solvent, a damping constant in units of $\text{time}^{-1}$.
  - For spherical particles of radius r in the limit of low Reynolds number, Stokes' law gives $\zeta = 6 \pi \, \eta \, r$.

The above equation may be rewritten as
$$\underbrace{M\ddot{X}}_{\text{inertial force}} + \underbrace{\nabla U(X)}_{\text{potential force}} + \underbrace{\zeta \dot{X}}_{\text{viscous force}} - \underbrace{\sqrt{2 \zeta k_\text{B} T} R(t)}_{\text{random force}} = 0$$
In Brownian dynamics, the inertial force term $M\ddot{X}(t)$ is so much smaller than the other three that it is considered negligible. In this case, the equation is approximately

$$0 = - \nabla U(X) - \zeta \dot{X}+ \sqrt{2 \zeta k_\text{B} T } R(t)$$

For spherical particles of radius $r$ in the limit of low Reynolds number, we can use the Stokes–Einstein relation. In this case, $D = k_\text{B} T/\zeta$, and the equation reads:

$$\dot{X}(t) = - \frac{D}{k_\text{B} T} \nabla U(X) + \sqrt{2 D} R(t).$$

For example, when the magnitude of the friction tensor $\zeta$ increases, the damping effect of the viscous force becomes dominant relative to the inertial force. Consequently, the system transitions from the inertial to the diffusive (Brownian) regime. For this reason, Brownian dynamics are also known as overdamped Langevin dynamics or Langevin dynamics without inertia.

== Inclusion of hydrodynamic interaction ==
In 1978, Ermak and McCammon suggested an algorithm for efficiently computing Brownian dynamics with hydrodynamic interactions. Hydrodynamic interactions occur when the particles interact indirectly by generating and reacting to local velocities in the solvent. For a system of $N$ three-dimensional particles diffusing subject to a force vector F(X), the derived Brownian dynamics scheme becomes:

$$X_i(t + \Delta t) = X_i(t) + \sum_j^N \frac{\Delta t D_{ij} }{k_\text{B} T} F[X_j(t)] + R_i(t)$$

where $D_{ij}$ is a diffusion matrix specifying hydrodynamic interactions, Oseen tensor for example, in non-diagonal entries interacting between the target particle $i$ and the surrounding particle $j$, $F$ is the force exerted on the particle $j$, and $R(t)$ is a Gaussian noise vector with zero mean and a standard deviation of $\sqrt{ 2 D \Delta t}$ in each vector entry. The subscripts $i$ and $j$ indicate the ID of the particles and $N$ refers to the total number of particles. This equation works for the dilute system where the near-field effect is ignored.

== See also ==
- Brownian motion
- Immersed boundary method
