= List of Cambridge mathematicians =

A list of mathematicians, past and present, with associations with the University of Cambridge.

== A - F ==
- Rediet Abebe, graduate student at Pembroke College, Cambridge
- Frank Adams, fellow of Trinity College, Cambridge, Lowndean Professor of Astronomy and Geometry 1970-1989
- John Couch Adams, fellow of St. John's College, Cambridge 1843–1852; fellow of Pembroke College, Cambridge 1853–1892; Lowndean Professor of Astronomy and Geometry 1859-1891
- Michael Atiyah, fellow of Trinity College, Cambridge 1954–1957; fellow of Pembroke College, Cambridge 1958–1961; Master of Trinity College, Cambridge 1990-1997
- Charles Babbage, Lucasian Professor of Mathematics 1828-1839
- Christopher Budd, Gresham Professor of Geometry, student at St John's College 1979-1983
- Alan Baker, fellow of Trinity College, Cambridge 1964-
- H. F. Baker, fellow of St. John's College, Cambridge
- Dennis Barden, fellow of Pembroke College, Cambridge
- Isaac Barrow, fellow of Trinity College, Cambridge 1649–1655, Lucasian Professor of Mathematics
- Arthur Berry, 1862-1929, Vice-Provost of King's College, Cambridge
- Bryan John Birch, undergraduate and research student at Trinity College, Cambridge, fellow of Churchill College, Cambridge
- Michael Boardman
- Béla Bollobás, fellow of Trinity College, Cambridge
- Richard Ewen Borcherds
- Henry Briggs, Fellow of St. John's College, Cambridge
- William Burnside, attended St John's College and Pembroke College, Cambridge. Appointed professor of mathematics at the Royal Naval College in Greenwich, at site of University of Greenwich Mathematics Department.
- Dame Mary Cartwright, fellow and Mistress of Girton College, Cambridge
- J. W. S. Cassels, fellow of Trinity College, Cambridge 1949–1984; Sadleirian Professor of Pure Mathematics 1967-1986
- Arthur Cayley, student at Trinity College, Cambridge
- D. G. Champernowne
- Sydney Chapman, student at and later lecturer and fellow (1914–1919) of Trinity College, Cambridge
- William Kingdon Clifford
- John Coates, fellow of Emmanuel College, Cambridge 1975–1977; Sadleirian Professor of Pure Mathematics 1986–2012
- John Horton Conway, fellow of Sidney Sussex College, Cambridge 1964–1970; fellow of Gonville and Caius College, Cambridge 1970-1986
- Roger Cotes
- Percy John Daniell
- Philip Dawid
- Harold Davenport
- James Davenport, undergraduate and research student at Trinity College, Cambridge
- Rollo Davidson, undergraduate and research fellow of Trinity College, Cambridge 1962–1970, fellow-elect of Churchill College, Cambridge
- Augustus De Morgan
- Paul Dirac, fellow of St. John's College, Cambridge 1927–1969; Lucasian Professor of Mathematics 1932-1969
- Simon Donaldson, undergraduate at Pembroke College, Cambridge 1976-1979
- Arthur Stanley Eddington
- Andrew Forsyth, fellow of Trinity College, Cambridge; Sadleirian Professor of Pure Mathematics

== G - M ==
- Anil Kumar Gain, Fellow of the Royal Statistical Society
- James Glaisher
- Peter Goddard, Master of St John's College, Cambridge 1994-2004
- William Timothy Gowers, fellow of Trinity College, Cambridge ?- ; Rouse Ball Professor of Mathematics 1998-
- Geoffrey Grimmett, fellow of Churchill College, Cambridge, Professor of Mathematical Statistics 1992-
- Ian Grojnowski, faculty member of DPMMS, 1999-
- G. H. Hardy, fellow of Trinity College, Cambridge 1900–1919, 1931–1942; Sadleirian Professor of Pure Mathematics 1931-1942
- Stephen Hawking, fellow of Gonville and Caius College, Cambridge 1966–2018; Lucasian Professor of Mathematics 1979-2009
- Nigel Hitchin, fellow of Gonville and Caius College, Cambridge, Rouse Ball Professor of Mathematics 1994-1997
- E. W. Hobson
- James Jeans
- Harold Jeffreys, fellow of St John's College, Cambridge 1914–1989; Plumian Professor of Astronomy 1946-1958
- Vinod Johri, Commonwealth fellow for post-doctorate work at Department of Applied Mathematics and Theoretical Physics, Cambridge University, 1967-1968
- Thomas Jones, mathematician, fellow of Trinity College, Cambridge
- Richard Jozsa, holder of the Leigh Trapnell Chair in Quantum Physics
- Frank Kelly, fellow 1976-2006 and master 2006- of Christ's College, professor of the Mathematics of Systems
- David George Kendall, fellow of Churchill College, Cambridge, Professor of Mathematical Statistics 1962-1985
- John Maynard Keynes, B.A. in mathematics
- Joshua King, Lucasian Professor of Mathematics, President of Queens' College, Cambridge
- Frances Kirwan
- Thomas William Körner, fellow of Trinity Hall, Cambridge
- Peter Landrock, senior member of the Wolfson College, Cambridge, 1997-
- Joseph Larmor, Lucasian Professor of Mathematics
- Imre Leader, fellow of Trinity College, Cambridge
- John Edensor Littlewood, fellow of Trinity College, Cambridge 1908–1977; Rouse Ball Professor of Mathematics 1928-1950
- Sir Donald MacAlister, fellow of St John's College, Cambridge
- Ian G. Macdonald, graduate of Trinity College, Cambridge
- James Clerk Maxwell, Cavendish Professor of Physics 1871-1879
- Isaac Milner, Lucasian Professor of Mathematics, President of Queens' College, Cambridge

== N - S ==
- Crispin St. J. A. Nash-Williams
- Max Newman, fellow of St John's College, Cambridge
- Isaac Newton, fellow of Trinity College, Cambridge 1667–1701; Lucasian Professor of Mathematics 1669-1702
- Richard Nickl, fellow of Gonville and Caius College, Cambridge, Professor of Mathematical Statistics
- James R. Norris, fellow of Churchill College, Cambridge
- Simon P. Norton, undergraduate and research student at Trinity College, Cambridge
- William McFadden Orr, fellow of St John's College, Cambridge
- Roger Penrose, graduate student at St John's College, Cambridge ?-1958; research fellow at St John's College, Cambridge 1958-1961
- Srinivasa Ramanujan, fellow of Trinity College, Cambridge 1918-1920
- Frank P. Ramsey, student of Trinity College, Cambridge and fellow of King's College, Cambridge
- CR Rao, statistician and former PhD student under Ronald Fisher
- Lewis Fry Richardson
- Chris Rogers
- Bertrand Russell, fellow of Trinity College, Cambridge
- Richard Samworth, fellow of St John's College, Cambridge, Professor of Statistics
- Graeme Segal, fellow of St John's College, Cambridge, Lowndean Professor of Astronomy and Geometry, 1990–1999
- Nicholas Shepherd-Barron, fellow of Trinity College, Cambridge
- David Spiegelhalter, fellow of Churchill College, Cambridge, Winton Professor of the Public Understanding of Risk 2007-
- Sir George Gabriel Stokes, fellow then Master of Pembroke College, Cambridge, Lucasian Professor of Mathematics
- Peter Swinnerton-Dyer, fellow of Trinity College, Cambridge, master of St Catharine's College, Cambridge
- James Joseph Sylvester, undergraduate at St John's College, Cambridge 1831-1837

== T - Z ==
- G. I. Taylor, fellow of Trinity College, Cambridge
- Martin J. Taylor, fellow of Trinity College, Cambridge
- Richard Taylor, fellow of Clare College, Cambridge
- John G. Thompson, fellow of Churchill College, Cambridge; Rouse Ball Professor of Mathematics 1971-1993
- Alan Turing, fellow of King's College, Cambridge 1935-1945
- W. T. Tutte, undergraduate and research student at Trinity College, Cambridge 1935-1941
- John Venn, fellow of Gonville and Caius College, Cambridge
- C. T. C. Wall, graduate of Trinity College, Cambridge
- John Wallis, fellow of Queens' College, Cambridge 1644-1645
- Richard Weber, fellow of Queens' College, Cambridge, Churchill Professor of Mathematics for Operational Research 1994-2017
- Alfred North Whitehead
- E. T. Whittaker graduate and fellow of Trinity College, Cambridge from 1882 to 1906
- Peter Whittle, fellow of Churchill College, Cambridge, Churchill Professor of Mathematics for Operational Research 1967-1994
- Andrew Wiles, research student and then junior research fellow at Clare College, Cambridge 1975-1980
- David Williams, professor of mathematical statistics 1985-1992
- Shaun Wylie, fellow of Trinity Hall, Cambridge
- Erik Christopher Zeeman, fellow of Gonville and Caius College, Cambridge, honorary fellow of Christ's College, Cambridge

== See also ==
- List of mathematicians
- Faculty of Mathematics, University of Cambridge
- Lucasian Chair
- Sadleirian Chair
- Rouse Ball Professor of Mathematics
- Lowndean Professor of Astronomy and Geometry
- Churchill Professorship of Mathematics for Operational Research
- Professorship of Mathematical Statistics, University of Cambridge
- List of Wranglers of the University of Cambridge
