= Khmaladze =

Khmaladze is a Georgian surname. It may refer to

- Estate Khmaladze (born 1944), Georgian statistician
  - Khmaladze transformation
- Giorgi Khmaladze, Georgian architect
- Lasha Khmaladze (born 1988), Georgian rugby union player
- Levan Khmaladze (born 1985), Georgian football midfielder

From the root "Khmali", meaning Sabre in Georgian
