= Estate Khmaladze =

Georgian statistician (born 1944)

Estate V. Khmaladze
- Born: October 20, 1944 (age 82); Tbilisi, Republic of Georgia, USSR
- Citizenship: Georgian, Australian
- Education: Tbilisi State University
- Known for: Probability theory, Statistics
- Scientific career
- Fields: Mathematics; Statistics
- Workplaces: Victoria University of Wellington
- Doctoral advisor: L. N. Bolshev

Estate V. Khmaladze (Georgian: ესტატე ხმალაძე, born October 20, 1944, in Tbilisi, Georgia) is a Georgian statistician. He is best known for his contribution of Khmaladze transformation in statistics.

== Biography ==
Estate Khmaladze was born October 20, 1944, Tbilisi, Georgia. He graduated from Tbilisi State University in 1966, where the first three years he was studying physics. He finished his PhD in 1971 at V. A. Steklov Mathematical Institute, Moscow, under supervision of L. N. Bolshev, who was head of department of mathematical statistics at Steklov after N. V. Smirnov. From 1972 until 1990, his work was, mostly, split between the Steklov Institute of Mathematics in Moscow, and the A. Razmadze Mathematical Institute at Tbilisi State University.

From 1990 to 1999, he was appointed head of department of probability theory and mathematical statistics of A. Razmadze Mathematical Institute of the Georgian National Academy of Sciences.

In 1996, Khmaladze moved with his family from Tbilisi, Georgia, to Sydney, Australia, and from there to Wellington, New Zealand, where in 2002 he was appointed Professor of Statistics after retirement of his predecessor, David Vere-Jones.

A characteristic feature of Khmaladze's work is the search of connection between distant analytical topics. For example, in Khmaladze (1993), the connections between the theory of spatial martingales and Volterra operators with goodness of fit problems of statistics was demonstrated, and in Khmaladze(2007), the infinitesimal theory for set-valued functions was extended to help with problems of spatial statistics and image analysis.

However, the majority of his mathematical research centers around empirical processes and distribution-free methods of testing statistical hypotheses.

A considerable amount of Khmaladze's work is in applications of statistics, in the fields of cito-genetics, physiology, demography and insurance, statistical analysis of texts, various problems in economics and finance. His current applied interests are focused on statistical theory of diversity and Zipf's law.
