= Mayhew Prize =

Award by the Faculty of Mathematics, University of Cambridge

The Mayhew Prize is a prize awarded annually by the Faculty of Mathematics, University of Cambridge to the student showing the greatest distinction in applied mathematics, primarily for courses offered by DAMTP, but also for some courses offered by the Statistical Laboratory, in the MASt examinations, also known as Part III of the Mathematical Tripos. This includes about half of all students taking the Tripos Math exam, since the rest are taking mainly pure mathematics courses. Since 2018 the Faculty have also awarded the Pure Mathematics Prize for pure mathematics, but due to an absence of funds there is no equivalent monetary reward.

The Mayhew Prize was founded in 1923 through a donation of £500 by William Loudon Mollison, Master of Clare College, in memory of his wife Ellen Mayhew (1846–1917).

== List of winners ==
Most of this list is from The Times newspaper archive. The winners of the prize are published in the Cambridge University Reporter.

- 1925 Sydney Goldstein
- 1926 John Arthur Gaunt and Alan Herries Wilson
- 1927 James Hargreaves
- 1928 Sir Maurice Joseph Dean
- 1929 Kenneth Lawrence Dunkley and Eustace Neville Fox
- 1930 John Conrad Jaeger
- 1931 Geoffrey William Carter
- 1932 Robert Allan Smith
- 1935 Noel Bryan Slater
- 1936 Fred Hoyle and George Stanley Rushbrooke
- 1937 J. Corner and Charles Henry Brian Priestley
- 1938 F. Booth
- 1939 John Currie Gunn and A. Nisbet
- 1941 Kenneth Le Couteur and T. Paterson
- 1942 James G. Oldroyd
- 1947 Keith Stewartson
- 1948 John Pople
- 1950 Roger Tayler
- 1954 Jeffrey Goldstone and Stanley Mandelstam
- 1955 Gordon Robert Screaton
- 1956 M.H. McAndrew and Graham P. McCauley
- 1957 C. Hunter and J. Nuttall
- 1958 I. Hunter
- 1959 Christopher J. Bradley and Robin W. Lardner
- 1960 John Robert Taylor
- 1961 John B. Boyling
- 1962 David Branson and W.G. Dixon
- 1963 Tim Pedley
- 1964 Geoffrey Charles Fox
- 1965 Christopher J. R. Garrett
- 1966 Neil W. Macfadyen and David L. Moss
- 1967 Peter Goddard and A.P. Hunt
- 1968 David John Collop and John Ellis
- 1969 P.V. Collins
- 1970 John Margarson Huthnance
- 1971 David Martin Scott and Malcolm A. Swinbanks
- 1972 Peter David D'Eath
- 1973 M.J. Bolton and Peter Harrison
- 1974 Bernard Silverman and William Morton
- 1975 L Ruth Cairnie Thomlinson and Richard Weber
- 1976 J.Y. Probert and Chris Rogers
- 1977 Simon J. Hathrell
- 1978 Stephen John Cowley and Glyn Patrick Moody
- 1979 Paul R.W. Mansfield
- 1980 Russell J. Gerrard
- 1981 William Shaw
- 1982 Richard David Ball and S.G. Goodyear
- 1983 Peter Julian Ruback
- 1984 John Ronald Lister
- 1985 Andrew David Gilbert
- 1986 Andrew William Woods
- 1987 Oliver E. Jensen
- 1988 Paul S. Montague
- 1989 Nicolas P.E. Weeds
- 1990 O.J. Harris and M.L.T. Loke
- 1991 Michael A. Earnshaw
- 1992 Paul A. Shah
- 1993 Simon F. Ross
- 1994 Raphael Lehrer and Dean Rasheed
- 1995 Marika Taylor
- 1996 Damon Jude Wischik
- 1997 David W. Essex and Harvey S. Reall
- 1998 Toby Wiseman
- 1999 James Sparks
- 2000 Gareth J.R. Birdsall
- 2001 Sean Hartnoll and Aninda Sinha
- 2002 Robert J. Whittaker
- 2003 Joseph Conlon
- 2004 William Hall
- 2005 Claude Warnick
- 2006 Chris Cawthorn
- 2007 Steffen Gielen
- 2008 Antoine Labatie
- 2009 Andrew Crosby
- 2010 Rosie Oglethorpe
- 2011 Mike Blake
- 2012 Gunnar Peng
- 2013 Pierre Haas
- 2014 James Munro
- 2015 Julio Parra Martinez
- 2016 Matthew Colbrook
- 2017 Dominic Skinner
- 2018 Daniel Zhang
- 2019 Edward Beaty
- 2021 Wilfred Salmon
- 2022 Adam Wills
- 2023 Robert Bourne
- 2024 Ruby Khondaker
- 2025 Timur Pryadilin

== See also ==
- List of mathematics awards
