= Richard M. Dudley =

American mathematician and professor (1938–2020)

Richard Mansfield Dudley
- Born: July 28, 1938; Cleveland, Ohio, USA
- Died: January 19, 2020 (aged 81)
- Education: Harvard University; Princeton University
- Scientific career
- Institutions: University of California, Berkeley; Massachusetts Institute of Technology
- Thesis: Lorentz-Invariant Random Distributions (1962)
- Doctoral advisor: Edward Nelson; Gilbert Hunt
- Doctoral students: Marjorie Hahn; Evarist Giné

Richard Mansfield Dudley (July 28, 1938 – January 19, 2020) was an American mathematician. He was Professor of Mathematics at the Massachusetts Institute of Technology from 1967 to his retirement in 2015.

== Education and career ==
Dudley was born in Cleveland, Ohio. He earned his BA at Harvard College and received his PhD at Princeton University in 1962 under the supervision of Edward Nelson and Gilbert Hunt. He was a Putnam Fellow in 1958. He was an instructor and assistant professor at University of California, Berkeley between 1962 and 1967, before moving to MIT as a professor in mathematics, where he stayed from 1967 until 2015, when he retired.

He died on January 19, 2020, following a long illness.

== Research ==
His work mainly concerned fields of probability, mathematical statistics, and machine learning, with highly influential contributions to the theory of Gaussian processes and empirical processes. He published over a hundred papers in peer-reviewed journals and authored several books. His specialty was probability theory and statistics, especially empirical processes. He is often noted for his results on the so-called Dudley entropy integral. In 2012 he became a fellow of the American Mathematical Society.

== Books ==
- Dudley, R. M. (1984), "A course on empirical processes", in Hennequin, P. L. (ed.), École d'Été de Probabilités de Saint-Flour XII - 1982, Lecture Notes in Mathematics, vol. 1097, Berlin, Heidelberg: Springer Berlin Heidelberg, pp. 1–142, doi:10.1007/bfb0099432, ISBN 978-3-540-13897-6
- Dudley, Richard M. (1989). Real analysis and probability. The Wadsworth & Brooks Cole mathematics series. Pacific Grove: Wadsworth & Brooks Cole Publ. Co. ISBN 978-0-534-10050-6. (Dudley, R. M. (2002). Real analysis and probability. Cambridge studies in advanced mathematics. Cambridge; New York: Cambridge University Press. ISBN 978-0-521-80972-6.)
- Dudley, Richard M.; Hahn, Marjorie G.; Kuelbs, James, eds. (1992). Probability in Banach Spaces, 8. Boston, MA: Birkhäuser Boston. doi:10.1007/978-1-4612-0367-4. ISBN 978-0-8176-3657-9.
- Dudley, Richard M.; Norvaiša, Rimas (1999). Differentiability of Six Operators on Nonsmooth Functions and p-Variation. Lecture Notes in Mathematics. Vol. 1703. Berlin, Heidelberg: Springer Berlin Heidelberg. doi:10.1007/bfb0100744. ISBN 978-3-540-65975-4.
- Dudley, R. M. (1999-07-28). Uniform Central Limit Theorems (1 ed.). Cambridge University Press. doi:10.1017/cbo9780511665622. ISBN 978-0-521-46102-3. (Dudley, R. M. (2014-02-24). Uniform Central Limit Theorems (2 ed.). Cambridge University Press. doi:10.1017/cbo9781139014830. ISBN 978-0-521-49884-5.)
