= Marika Taylor =

Professor of Theoretical Physics

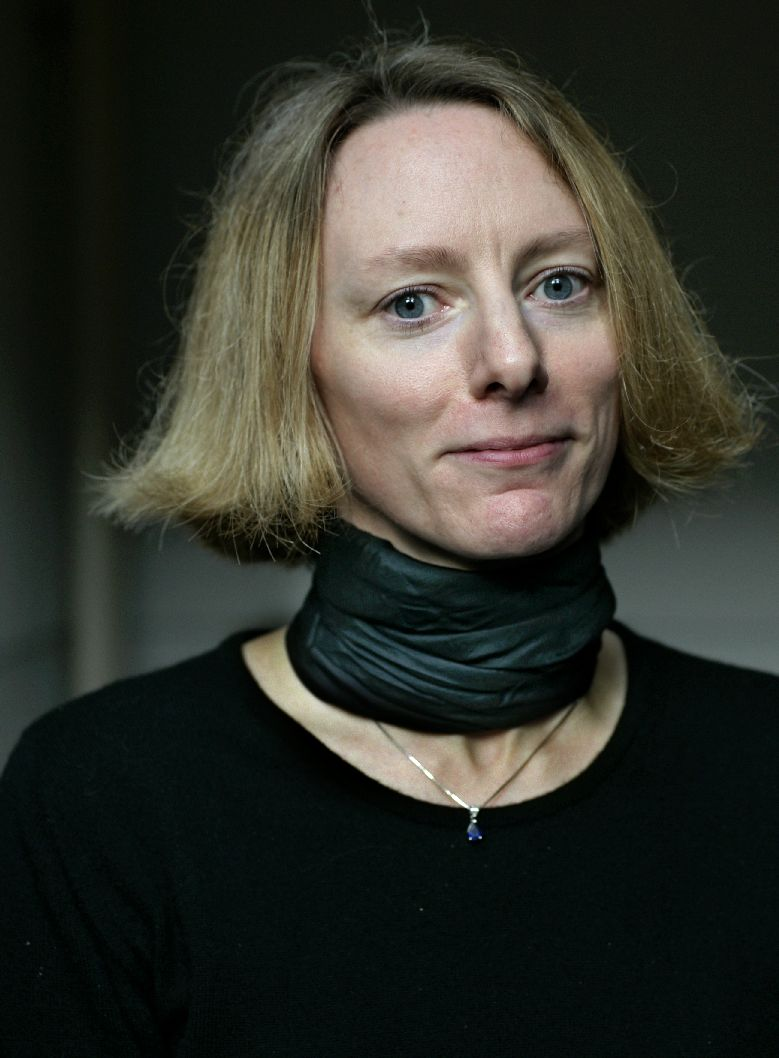
- Taylor in 2009
- Born: Marika Maxine Taylor; 1974 (age 51–52)
- Education: University of Cambridge (BA, PhD)
- Awards: Mayhew Prize (1995)
- Scientific career
- Fields: Holography; Cosmology; Theoretical physics
- Workplaces: University of Birmingham; University of Southampton; University of Amsterdam
- Thesis: Problems in M theory (1998)
- Doctoral advisor: Stephen Hawking
- Website: www.birmingham.ac.uk/staff/profiles/eps/taylor-marika.aspx

Marika Maxine Taylor (born 1974) is a Professor of Theoretical Physics, Pro-Vice Chancellor and Head of College of Engineering and Physical Sciences at the University of Birmingham. She started this role in September 2023 after being Head of School for Mathematics at the University of Southampton.

== Early life and education ==
Taylor was inspired to study physics after reading A Brief History of Time whilst an GCE Advanced Level student. She studied Physics and Theoretical Physics at the University of Cambridge, where she heard a series of lectures by Stephen Hawking and Roger Penrose about cosmology. This inspired her to choose courses on cosmology and black holes for her final year of study. She stayed at Cambridge, where she completed Part III of the Mathematical Tripos. In 1995 she won the Mayhew Prize, awarded annually by the Faculty of Mathematics, University of Cambridge, to the student showing the greatest distinction in Applied Mathematics. Her doctoral thesis Problems in M-theory, was supervised by Stephen Hawking which she completed in 1998. She continued to publish with Hawking after leaving Cambridge.

== Research and career ==
Taylor's research is focussed on string theory, quantum field theory and gravitational physics. She uses the holographic principle to investigate the physical properties of black holes and condensed matter systems. The holographic principle allows Taylor to relate gravitational theories to theories without gravity, in one dimension lower. The holographic principle suggests that Einstein's picture of black holes isn't entirely correct – instead of matter getting sucked into the event horizon of a black hole, it remains as a hologram.

She was a postdoctoral fellow in Cambridge and Utrecht. She joined the Institute for Theoretical Physics at the University of Amsterdam in 2004.

In 2012, Taylor joined the University of Southampton, where as of 2018 she is a professor. She was involved with The String Universe, a 2017 multi-institution COST Action grant exploring cosmology and string theory. As part of the initiative, Taylor arranged a series of events related to diversity in string theory.Taylor has contributed to The Conversation.

She regularly gives invited talks, seminars and popular science discussions relating to string theory, symmetries and entanglement.

She contributed to the New Scientist collection Where the Universe Came From: How Einstein's relativity unlocks the past, present and future of the cosmos.

On 6 June 2023, she was appointed as Pro-Vice-Chancellor and Head of the College of Engineering & Physical Sciences of the University of Birmingham.

=== Awards and honours ===
Taylor is a former member of the Young Academy of the Royal Netherlands Academy of Arts and Sciences. In 2008 she won the Minerva Prize, awarded annually by the Netherlands Organisation for Scientific Research for her paper Fuzzball solutions for black holes and D1-brane-D5-brane microstates. In the paper she described the microscopic description of the physics of black holes. She explored the possibility of Non-relativistic holography.
