= Evarist Giné =

Catalan mathematician and statistician (1944-2015)

Evarist Giné-Masdéu (July 31, 1944 – March 13, 2015), or simply Evarist Giné, was a Catalan mathematician and statistician. He is known for his pioneering works in probability in Banach spaces, empirical process theory, U-statistics and processes, and nonparametric statistics.

== Education and career ==
Giné was born in Falset in Catalonia. He studied at the University of Barcelona, obtaining a Licenciatura degree in 1967. He went to the United States and completed his PhD at the Massachusetts Institute of Technology in 1973 under the supervision of Richard M. Dudley. He was a lecturer in statistics at University of California, Berkeley from 1974 to 1975. He spent time afterwards at the Venezuelan Institute for Scientific Research, where he was the head of the mathematics department, before moving back to the United States.

In 1983, Giné became a professor at Texas A&M University and later moved to College of Staten Island of the City University of New York in 1988. He became a professor of mathematics at the University of Connecticut in 1990, and was the head of the department of mathematics from 2012. He stayed at the University of Connecticut until his death.

== Bibliography ==
- Araujo, Aloisio; Giné, Evarist (1980). The central limit theorem for real and Banach valued random variables. Wiley series in probability and mathematical statistics. New York: Wiley. ISBN 978-0-471-05304-0.
- Giné, Evarist; Grimmett, Geoffrey R.; Saloff-Coste, Laurent (1997). Lectures on Probability Theory and Statistics: Ecole d'Ete de Probabilites de Saint-Flour XXVI. Springer Berlin Heidelberg. doi:10.1007/BFb0092617. ISBN 978-3-540-63190-3.
- de la Peña, Víctor H.; Giné, Evarist (1999). Decoupling: From Dependence to Independence. Springer New York. doi:10.1007/978-1-4612-0537-1. ISBN 978-1-4612-6808-6.
- Giné, Evarist; Koltchinskii, Vladimir; Norvaisa, Rimas, eds. (2010). Selected Works of R.M. Dudley. Springer New York. doi:10.1007/978-1-4419-5821-1. ISBN 978-1-4419-5820-4.
- Giné, Evarist; Nickl, Richard (18 November 2015). Mathematical Foundations of Infinite-Dimensional Statistical Models. Cambridge University Press. doi:10.1017/CBO9781107337862. ISBN 978-1-107-04316-9.
