= Marjorie Hahn =

American tennis player and mathematician

- Born: December 30, 1948 (age 77)
- Other name: Molly Greene
- Citizenship: American
- Education: Stanford University 1971, Massachusetts Institute of Technology
- Occupations: Mathematician, Tennis player
- Known for: Fellow of the Institute of Mathematical Statistics
- Notable work: played on the Stanford team
- Spouse: Peter Florin Hahn

Marjorie "Molly" Greene Hahn (born December 30, 1948) is an American mathematician and tennis player. In mathematics and mathematical statistics she is known for her research in probability theory, including work on central limit theorems, stochastic processes, and stochastic differential equations. She is a professor emeritus of mathematics at Tufts University.

== Education ==
Molly Greene did her undergraduate studies at Stanford University, graduating in 1971. She went on to graduate study at the Massachusetts Institute of Technology, and married Peter Florin Hahn in 1973. Like Greene, Peter Hahn had graduated with great distinction from Stanford in 1971; he was a graduate student in mathematics at Harvard University, and went on to a career in radiology at Harvard.

Marjorie Hahn completed her Ph.D. in 1975. Her dissertation, supervised by Richard M. Dudley, was Central Limit Theorems for D[0,1]-Valued Random Variables.

== Academic career ==
After postdoctoral study at the University of California, Berkeley, Hahn became a faculty member at Tufts University in 1977. While active at Tufts, she supervised the dissertations of 16 doctoral students, more than anyone else in the department; her students included legal statistician Weiwen Miao. She retired as professor emeritus in 2016.

In 1985, Hahn was elected as a Fellow of the Institute of Mathematical Statistics.

== Tennis ==
Hahn is also a tennis player. She played on the Stanford Cardinals team from 1967 to 1971, and passed up a chance to play tennis professionally in favor of her work in mathematics. In 2006, her name was added to the United States Tennis Association New England Hall of Fame.

In 2008, she represented the U.S. in an international seniors competition, the Alice Marble Cup, where she helped her team win a silver medal. In 2017, she was part of a U.S. team that won the Kitty Godfrey Cup for women 65 or over at the International Tennis Federation World Super-Senior team championships.

Comparing mathematics with tennis, Hahn has said "In mathematics, you try to prove things step by step; you attempt to set up a logical method. I approach tennis by using this plan and then adjust on the fly."
