= Ioannis Kontoyiannis =

- Γιάννης Κοντογιάννης
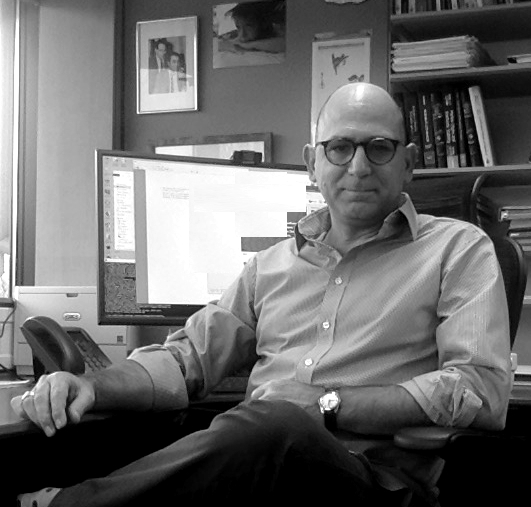
- Kontoyiannis in 2020
- Born: January 1972 (age 54)
- Education: Imperial College (B.Sc.); University of Cambridge (Part III); Stanford University (M.S., Ph.D.)
- Scientific career
- Fields: Information theory; Probability; Statistics; Machine learning
- Thesis: Recurrence and waiting times in stationary processes, and their applications in data compression (1998)
- Doctoral advisor: Thomas M. Cover; Amir Dembo
- Website: http://www.dpmms.cam.ac.uk/person/ik355/

Ioannis Kontoyiannis (born January 1972) is a Greek mathematician and information theorist. He is the Churchill Professor of Mathematics of Information with the Statistical Laboratory, in the Department of Pure Mathematics and Mathematical Statistics, of the University of Cambridge. He is also a Fellow of Darwin College, Cambridge.

His research connects information theory, probability and statistics, encompassing the fundamental limits of data compression and communication, entropy estimation, and the theory of Markov processes. His work includes entropy inequalities and their connections with additive combinatorics, and the development, with collaborators, of Bayesian methods for time-series modelling and causal inference. He has also developed applications in data compression, bioinformatics, neuroscience, machine learning, public health and cybersecurity.

He was named a Fellow of the IEEE in 2011 and a Fellow of the Institute of Mathematical Statistics in 2023, and he is a co-investigator with EPSRC's INFORMED-AI Hub, working on information-theoretic foundations of distributed AI.

== Education and career ==
Kontoyiannis earned a B.S. in mathematics from Imperial College, University of London (1992), he obtained a distinction in Part III of the Cambridge University Pure Mathematical Tripos (1993), and he earned an M.S. in statistics (1997) and a Ph.D. in electrical engineering (1998), both from Stanford University. Between 1998 and 2018 he taught at Purdue University, Brown University, Columbia University, and at the Athens University of Economics and Business. In January 2018 he joined the Information Engineering Division at Cambridge University, as Professor of Information and Communications, and Head of the Signal Processing and Communications Laboratory.

Since June 2020 he has been with the Statistical Laboratory, in the Department of Pure Mathematics and Mathematical Statistics, University of Cambridge, where he holds the Churchill Chair in the Mathematics of Information. Currently he is Chair of the Faculty of Mathematics at Cambridge, Chairman of the Rollo Davidson Trust, and Manager of the Whittle Fund.

== Research ==
Kontoyiannis' research lies at various points of intersection between information theory, probability and statistics, and it examines their applications in machine learning and AI. His early work considered the relationship between recurrence times in stationary processes, entropy estimation and data compression. More recently, he has established, with collaborators, nonasymptotic results on the fundamental limits of data compression.

In probability, Kontoyiannis and Sean Meyn developed a spectral theory for analysing asymptotic properties of Markov processes. Their later related work studies stochastic approximation and its applications to reinforcement learning.

Kontoyiannis used entropy to investigate probabilistic and algebraic structure in combinatorics. With collaborators, he established inequalities for the entropy of sums of random variables on abelian groups, developing connections between information theory and additive combinatorics. With Lampros Gavalakis, he obtained an information-theoretic proof of the discrete central limit theorem and quantitative finite versions of de Finetti’s representation theorem.

In statistical methodology, Kontoyiannis and collaborators introduced Bayesian Context Trees, a framework for modelling variable-memory time series. His statistics research also includes work with Thomas Berrett and Richard Samworth on independence testing.

== Awards and honors ==
- Manning endowed assistant professorship (2002)
- Alfred P. Sloan Foundation Research Fellowship (2004)
- Honorary Master of Arts Degree Ad Eundem, Brown University (2005)
- Marie Curie Fellowship (2009)
- IEEE Fellow (2011) "for contributions to data compression".
- AAIA Fellow (2022)
- IMS Fellow (2023) "for outstanding contributions to fundamental problems in information theory; and for consistent and important contributions in developing the deep connections of information theory with probability and statistics".
- AIIA Fellow (2024)
