= Geoffrey C. Fox =

British computer scientist and physicist

Geoffrey Fox
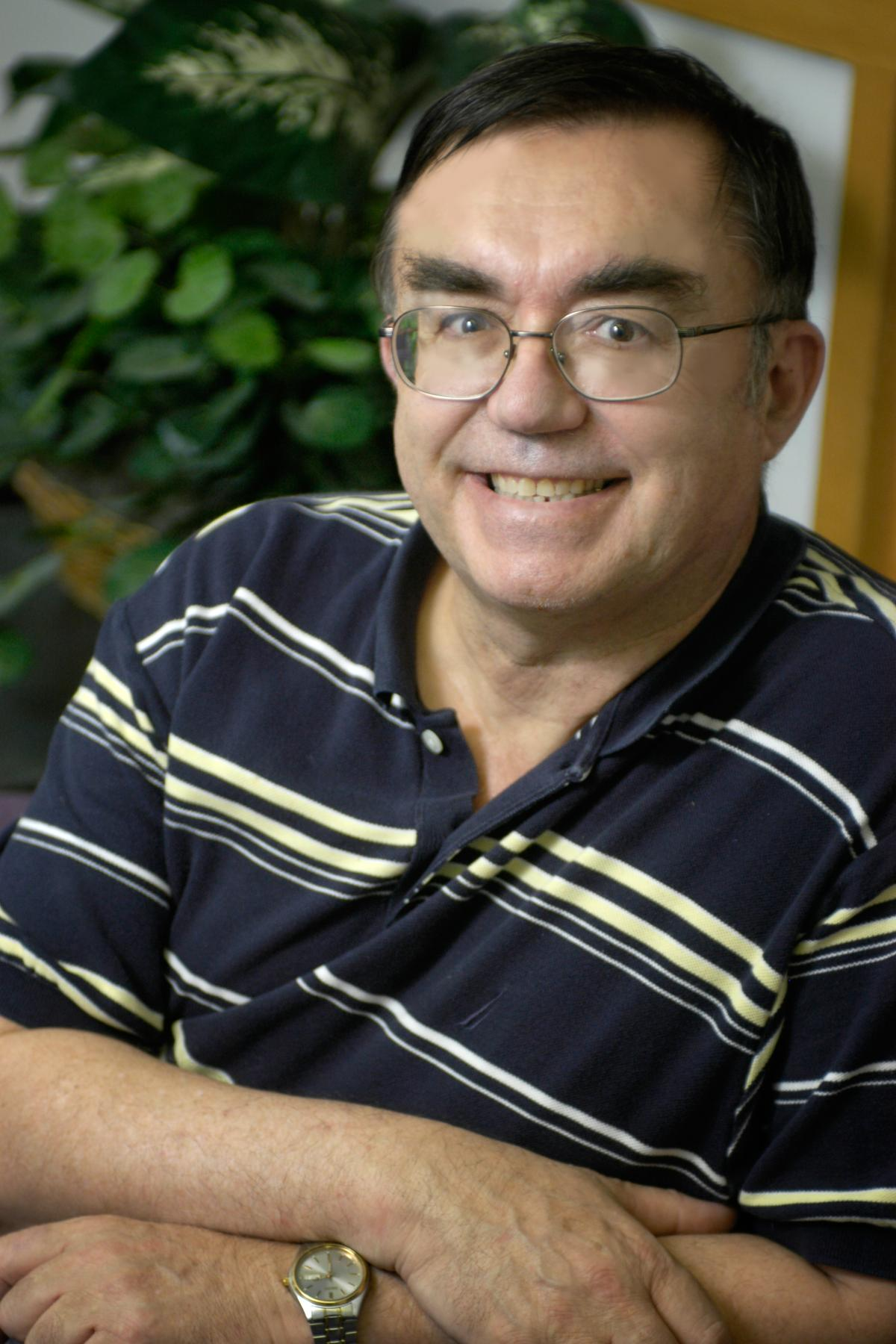
- Geoffrey Fox at Indiana in 2004
- Born: Geoffrey C. Fox; June 7, 1944 (age 82); Dunfermline, Scotland
- Education: Cambridge University
- Known for: Cyberinfrastructure, E-Science, High Performance Computing, Matrix Multiplication
- Awards: ACM Fellow; Fellow of the American Physical Society; Mayhew Prize (1964)
- Scientific career
- Fields: Computer science, physics
- Workplaces: California Institute of Technology, Syracuse University, Florida State University, Indiana University, University of Virginia
- Thesis: Scattering of Particles with Spin And Electromagnetic Interactions (1967)
- Doctoral advisor: Richard J. Eden
- Other academic advisors: Richard Feynman

Geoffrey Charles Fox (born 7 June 1944) is a British-born American theoretical physicist and computer scientist known for his contributions to parallel computing, data-intensive computing, and high-performance computing (HPC).

He is a professor at the Computer Science Biocomplexity Institute at the University of Virginia and also served as the Director of the Digital Science Center.

He has authored over 1200 publications in physics and computer science, including his book Parallel Computing Works!. He was awarded Ken Kennedy Award in 2019 by Association for Computing Machinery and the IEEE Computer Society.

== Biography ==
He was born in Scotland and demonstrated early aptitude in mathematics and science.

Fox was educated at the Leys School and Trinity College, Cambridge. In 1964, he was the Senior Wrangler at Cambridge, the highest scorer in the mathematics tripos. That same year, he played in the annual chess match against Oxford University and received the Mayhew Prize for Applied Mathematics. He earned a Ph.D. in theoretical physics from Cambridge University in 1967. As an undergraduate research student, he worked in the laboratory of Francis Crick, co-discoverer of the DNA double helix.

=== Academic career ===
Fox's academic career began at Caltech, where he worked from 1970 to 1990. He then joined Syracuse University from 1990 to 2000 and Florida State University from 2000 to 2001. In July 2001, Fox became a professor at Indiana University., where he served as the director of the Digital Science Center and associate dean for research and graduate studies at the School of Informatics and Computing. As of March 2024, he holds the position of professor at the University of Virginia's Computer Science Biocomplexity Institute.

In 1989, Fox was elected a Fellow of the American Physical Society for contributions to the use of computers in particle physics. He is also a Fellow of the Association for Computing Machinery for contributions to parallel computing.

Fox received the High-Performance Parallel and Distributed Computing (HPDC) Achievement Award

=== Research ===
Fox was the director of FutureSystems, a cyberinfrastructure project active until December, 2021. He is involved in projects aimed at enhancing the capabilities of minority serving institutions. His research interests include applications of computer science in bioinformatics, defense, earthquake and ice-sheet science, particle physics, and chemical informatics. He focuses on network systems science, high-performance computing and clouds, AI for science, deep learning for data analytics and simulation surrogates, and the interface of data engineering and data science with data systems.

== Selected bibliography ==
=== Books ===
- Fox, Geoffrey, ed. (1988). Proceedings of the third conference on Hypercube concurrent computers and applications Architecture, software, computer systems, and general issues -. Vol. 1. New York, New York, USA: ACM Press. doi:10.1145/62297. ISBN 0-89791-278-0.
- Fox, Geoffrey C., ed. (1988). Solving problems on concurrent processors. 1: General techniques and regular problems / Geoffrey C. Fox. Englewood Cliffs, NJ: Prentice-Hall. ISBN 978-0-13-823022-7.
- Fox, Geoffrey C.; Angus, Ian G., eds. (1988). Solving problems on concurrent processors. Englewood Cliffs, N.J: Prentice Hall. ISBN 978-0-13-823022-7.
- Fox, Geoffrey C.; Williams, Roy D.; Messina, Paul C. (1994), "Parallel Computing in Industry", Parallel Computing Works!, Elsevier, pp. 787–793, doi:10.1016/b978-0-08-051351-5.50023-3, ISBN 978-0-08-051351-5
- Dongarra, Jack, ed. (2009). Sourcebook of parallel computing (Nachdr. ed.). San Francisco, Calif.: Morgan Kaufmann. ISBN 978-1-55860-871-9.
- Berman, Francine; Fox, Geoffrey; Hey, Anthony J. G.; Berman, Francine, eds. (2005). Grid computing: making the global infrastructure a reality. Wiley series in communications networking & distributed systems (Repr ed.). Chichester Weinheim: Wiley. ISBN 978-0-470-85319-1.
- Hwang, Kai; Fox, Geoffrey C.; Dongarra, J. J. (2012). Distributed and cloud computing: from parallel processing to the Internet of things. Amsterdam; Boston: Morgan Kaufmann. ISBN 978-0-12-385880-1.
