= Nicholas Bingham =

British mathematician (born 1945)

Nick Bingham
- Born: 19 March 1945 (age 81); York, England
- Education: Oxford University; Cambridge University
- Scientific career
- Fields: Probability, Analysis
- Workplaces: London School of Economics; Imperial College London
- Doctoral advisor: D.G. Kendall

Nicholas Hugh Bingham (born 19 March 1945) is a British mathematician working in the field of probability theory, stochastic analysis and analysis more generally.

== Education and career ==
Bingham is currently a Senior Research Investigator at Imperial College London, and is a visiting professor at both the London School of Economics and the University of Liverpool.

Bingham studied at Trinity College, Oxford, earning a BA in mathematics with first-class honours from the University of Oxford in 1966 (this degree was later elevated to an MA in 1985). He then pursued doctoral research at Churchill College, Cambridge, completing his PhD in mathematics at the University of Cambridge in 1969 under the supervision of David George Kendall. His thesis was titled Limit theorems and semigroups in probability theory. In 1996, he was additionally awarded a ScD degree, a higher doctorate, by Cambridge.

He serves as associate editor of Expositiones Mathematicae and obituaries editor of the London Mathematical Society.

With C.M. Goldie and Jozef L. Teugels, Bingham wrote the book Regular Variation; with Rüdiger Kiesel Risk-neutral Valuation: Pricing and Hedging of Financial Derivatives; with J. M. Fry Regression.

== Personal life ==
Bingham is married to Cecilie (m. 1980). They have 3 children: James (1982), Ruth (1985), and Tom (1993).

He is a competitive runner, with a best marathon time of 2:46:52 in the 1991 Abingdon Marathon, aged 46. He is a member of Barnet and District AC.
