= Chris Rogers (mathematician) =

British mathematician

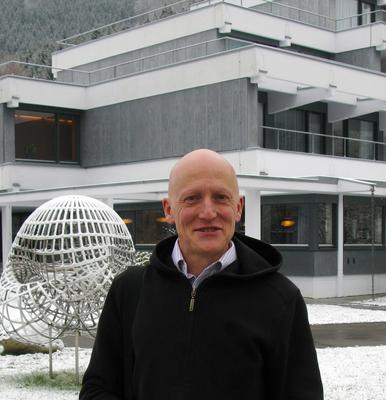
- Rogers at Oberwolfach, 2012
- Born: 29 April 1954 (age 72); Lower Hutt, New Zealand
- Education: University of Cambridge
- Scientific career
- Workplaces: Warwick University; University College of Swansea; University of Cambridge; Queen Mary and Westfield College; University of Bath
- Thesis: Topics in the Theory of Markov Processes (1980)
- Doctoral advisor: David Williams

Leonard Christopher Gordon Rogers (born 29 April 1954) is a mathematician working in probability theory and quantitative finance. He is Emeritus Professor of Statistical Science in the Statistical Laboratory, University of Cambridge.

Rogers' specialist fields include stochastic analysis and applications to quantitative finance. With David Williams he has written two influential textbooks on diffusion processes.

He was awarded the Mayhew Prize of Cambridge University in 1976, and the Rollo Davidson Prize in 1984. He was elected an Honorary Fellow of the Institute of Actuaries in 2003.

Rogers was an undergraduate at St John's College, Cambridge, where he graduated in 1975 and completed his PhD in 1980. He has held positions at several UK universities, including Warwick University (1980–1983), University College of Swansea (1983–1985), Cambridge University (1985–1991), Queen Mary and Westfield College (1991–1994), and the University of Bath (1994–2002). He was elected to the Cambridge Professorship of Statistical Science in 2002.

== Selected publications ==
- Rogers, L. C. G.; Williams, D. (2000). Diffusions, Markov processes, and martingales. Cambridge, U.K.: Cambridge University Press. ISBN 0-521-77594-9. OCLC 42874839.
- Rogers, L. C. G. (2013). Optimal Investment. Heidelberg: Springer. doi:10.1007/978-3-642-35202-7. ISBN 978-3-642-35201-0.
