= William Shaw (mathematician) =

William Thornton Shaw (born 14 May 1958) is a British mathematician, and formerly professor of the mathematics and computation of risk at University College London. He is a consultant on financial derivatives, an author of a primary book on using Mathematica to model financial derivatives, formerly co-Editor-in-Chief of the journal Applied Mathematical Finance.

Shaw studied at King's College, Cambridge, where he studied mathematics; he was Wrangler and earned a B.A. in 1980. In 1981 he won the Mayhew Prize for his performance on the Cambridge Mathematical Tripos. In 1984 he received a D.Phil. (PhD) in mathematical physics from Wolfson College, Oxford. From 1984 to 1987 he was a research fellow at Clare College, Cambridge and C.L.E. Moore Instructor at the Massachusetts Institute of Technology. From 1987 to 1990, he worked for Smith Associates in Guildford, and ECL in Henley-on Thames. From 1991 to 2002 he was a lecturer in mathematics at Balliol College, Oxford. In 2002 he moved to St Catherine's College, Oxford, where he was University Lecturer in financial mathematics. In 2006 he moved to a Professorship at King's College London and in 2011 to a Professorship at UCL. He returned to the financial industry in 2012 and remained a visiting professor at UCL until 2017.

== Books ==
- Applied Mathematica: Getting Started, Getting it Done by W.T. Shaw and J. Tigg. Addison-Wesley, 1993.
- Modelling Financial Derivatives with Mathematica by W.T. Shaw, Cambridge University Press, 1998.
- Complex Analysis with Mathematica by W.T. Shaw, Cambridge University Press, 2006.
