= Peter H. Haynes =

British mathematician

- Scientific career
- Thesis: Nonlinear Rossby wave critical layers in the stratosphere (1983)
- Website: www.damtp.cam.ac.uk/user/phh/

Peter Howard Haynes FRS (born 23 July 1958) is a British applied mathematician in the Faculty of Mathematics at the University of Cambridge. He is a Fellow of Queens' College, Cambridge and served as head of the Department of Applied Mathematics and Theoretical Physics (DAMTP) from 2005 to 2015.

He was educated at the Royal Grammar School, Guildford, and Queens' College, Cambridge (B.A. 1979, M.A. 1983, Ph.D. 1984).

== Research ==
His research includes fluid dynamics and atmospheric dynamics.
