= Theresianum =

Private school in Vienna, Austria

Coordinates: 48°11′35″N 16°22′14″E

- German: Theresianische Akademie
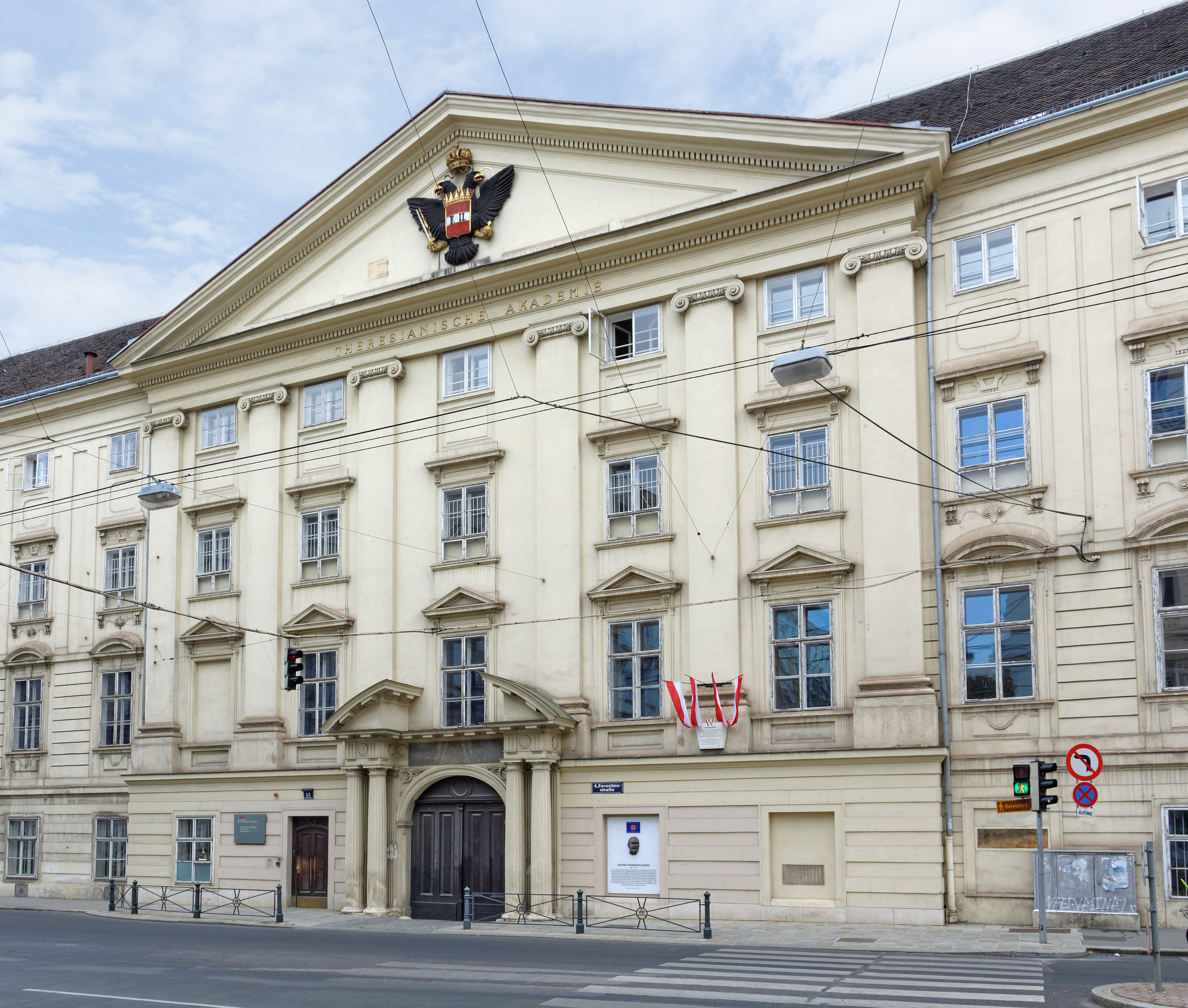

Information
- Other name: Theresian Academy
- Established: 1746; 280 years ago
- Founder: Maria Theresa
- Gender: Boys (1746-1989); Mixed (1989 - present)
- Language: German
- Website: www.theresianum.ac.at

Theresianum (or Theresian Academy; German: Theresianische Akademie) is a private boarding and day school governed by the laws for public schools in Vienna, Austria. It was founded in 1746 by Empress Maria Theresa of Austria.

== History ==
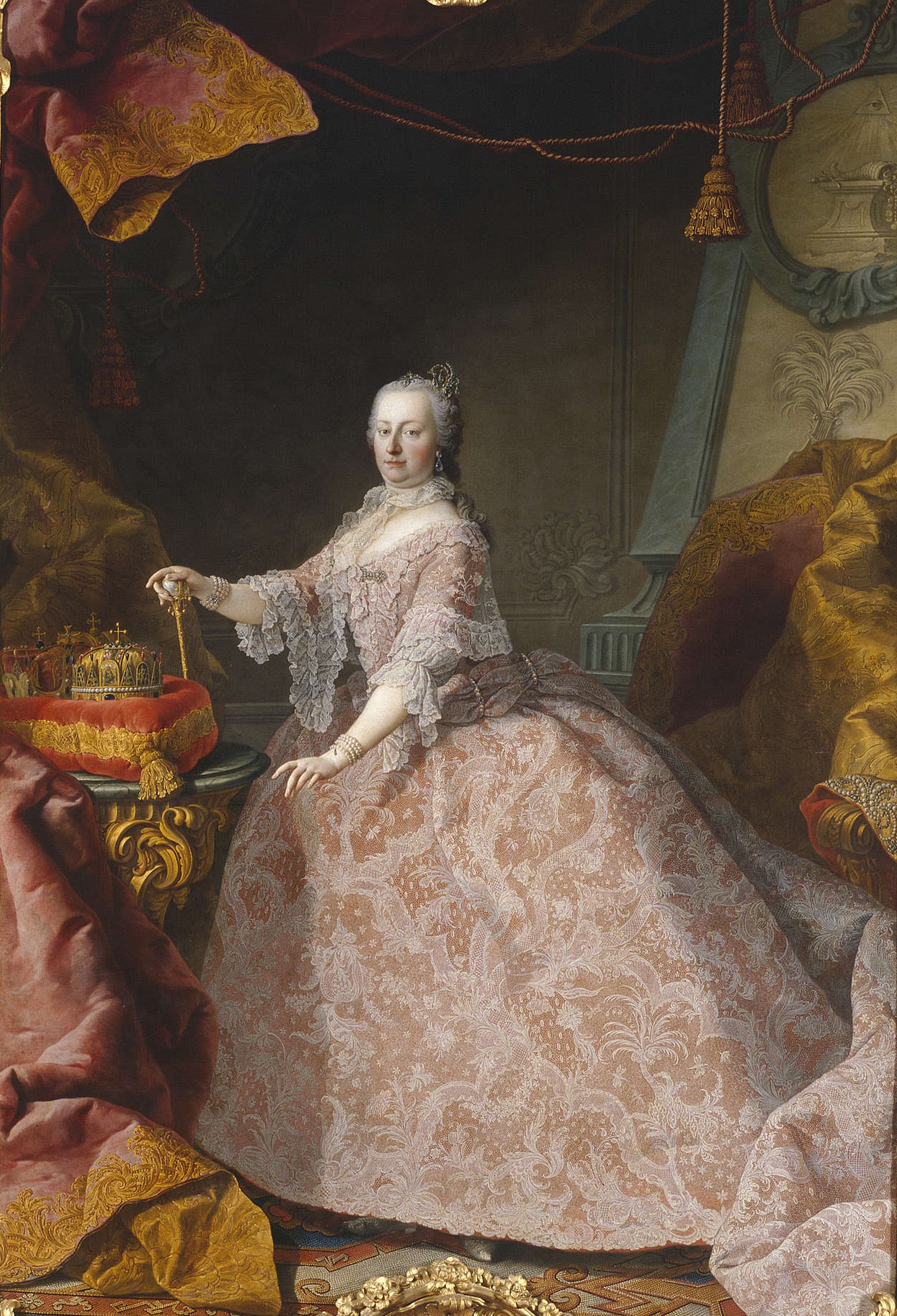
Maria Theresa of Austria founded the Collegium Theresianum in 1746

=== Early history (1614–1746) ===
In 1614, the Habsburgs purchased Angerfeldhof, a farmstead located just outside Vienna, and renovated it. Favorita, as the Habsburgs would call the re-modeled farmstead, became their imperial summer residence and a well-known venue for performances in the second half of the 17th century.

Although the residence was burned down in the course of the Battle of Vienna in 1683, a bigger and more glamorous Neue Favorita was rebuilt over the following decades. Three emperors of the Holy Roman Empire – Leopold I, Joseph I and Charles VI – resided in the palace. In 1740, when Charles VI died in Neue Favorita, his eldest daughter Maria Theresa decided not to enter the building again.

=== Founding and sustaining Theresianum (1746–1964) ===
In 1746, Empress Maria Theresa sold the palace to the Jesuits for 30,000 guilders in order to transform it into an educational institution, preparing talented young men for civil service. As stipulated in two founding letters, the newly established “imperial academy” under the auspices of Maria Theresa was based on the principles of strict selection, the highest pedagogic and scientific standards, and instruction in “modern” foreign languages.

In 1773, after Maria Theresa's son Joseph II had dissolved the religious order of the Society of Jesus, Theresianum was temporarily closed. More than 20 years later, in 1797, Francis II re-opened Theresianum under the direction of the Piarists. He also completed the building's present-day neo-classical façade and built ancillary facilities, including a swim school. After the 1848 revolutions in different parts of Europe, Francis II's successor, Franz Joseph I, decided to open admission to “sons of the bourgeoisie” and to put the school under public regulation.

In 1883, the Consular Academy, the world's oldest school of international relations (founded by Maria Theresa as the Oriental Academy in 1754 and later renamed), was relocated to Neue Favorita. It was housed in a separate wing of the building until 1905, when it was moved to a house in Boltzmanngasse, which houses the U.S. embassy today.

By the end of World War I, most of the school's properties in Austria, Hungary and other parts of the Habsburg monarchy were sold. In 1938, after the “Anschluss” to Nazi Germany, Theresianum was transformed into a National Political Institute of Education. During World War II, the school was so heavily damaged that it could only be re-opened following extensive renovation work in 1957.

=== Recent history (1964–present) ===
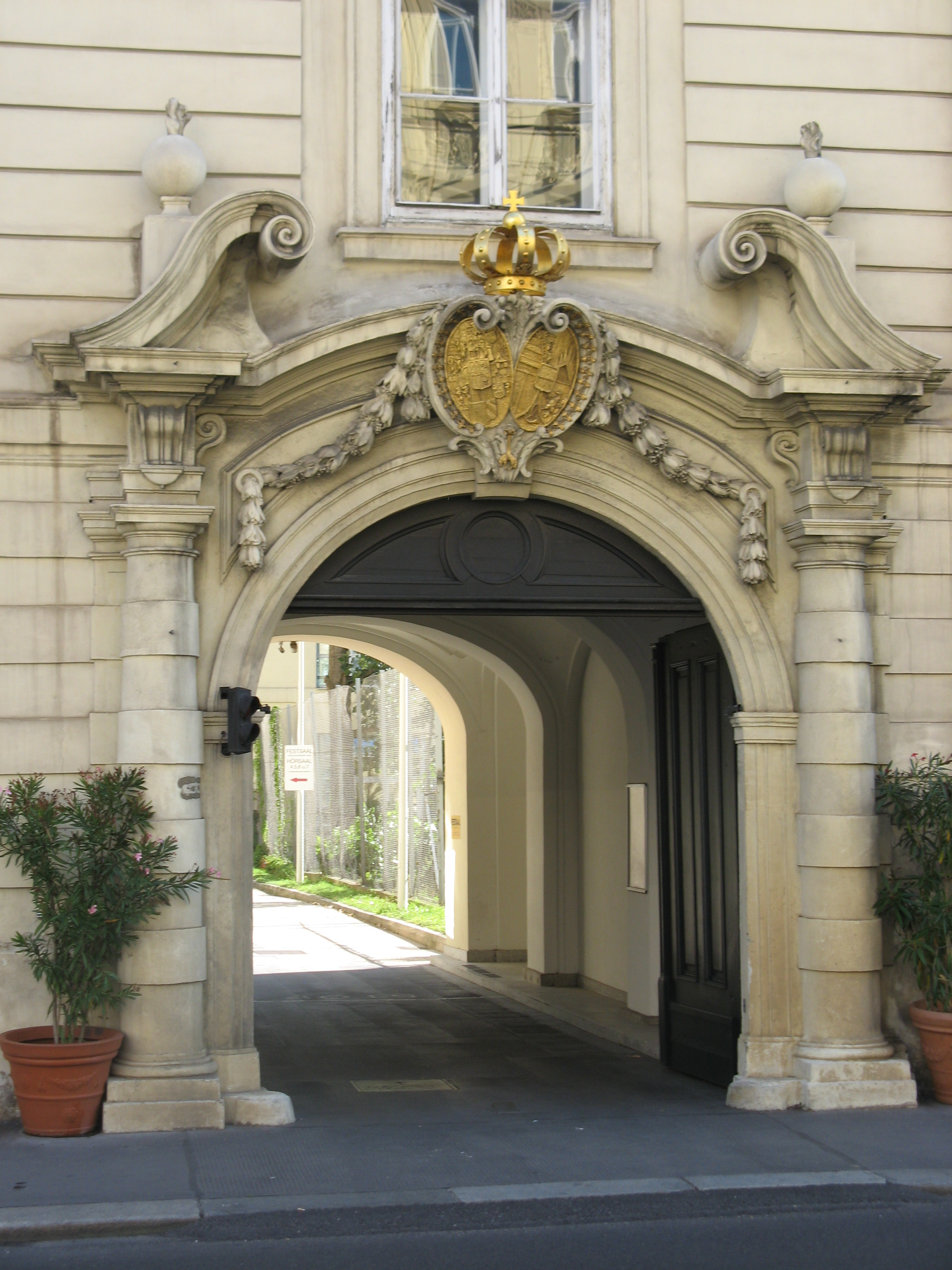
Entrance to the Diplomatic Academy adjacent to Theresianum

In 1964, the Diplomatic Academy was re-opened as a successor to the Consular Academy in Neue Favorita. Its graduates include former U.N. Secretary General and Austrian president Kurt Waldheim, as well as European ministers and senior public officials.

At Theresianum, co-education was introduced at the end of the 1980s – the first female instructors started teaching in 1988, while the first female students were admitted one year later, in 1989; in 1993, the first headmistress was appointed.

== Theresianum today ==
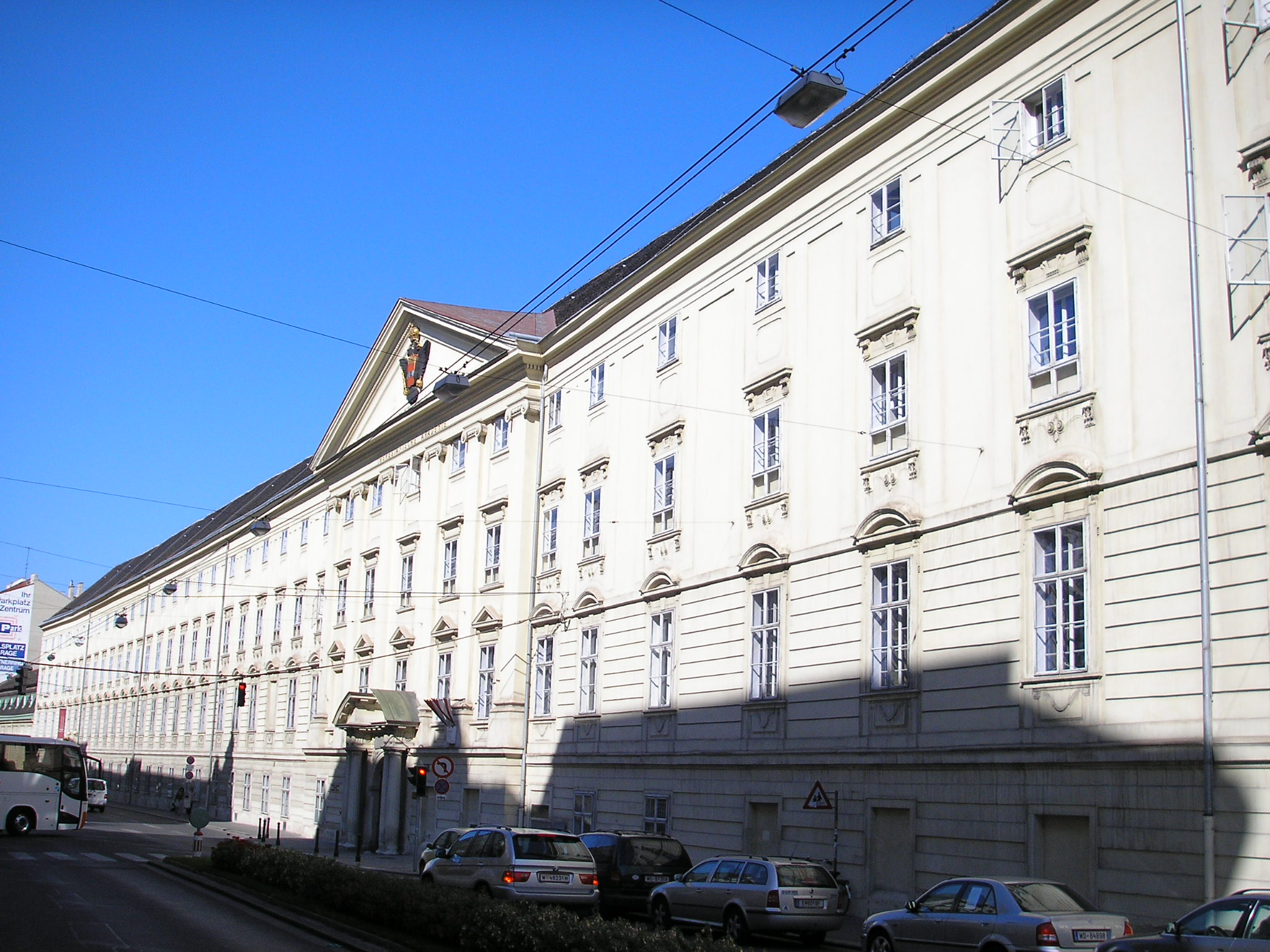
Theresianum today

=== International focus ===
Before World War I, instruction in Hungarian was mandatory, while learning English, French, Italian, Polish, Bohemian, Slovenian, Serbo-Croatian and Romanian was optional. Today, the school's curriculum requires students to learn three spoken foreign languages (English and French) as well as Latin. Optional coursework includes Russian, Spanish, Italian, Portuguese, Hungarian, Polish, Japanese and Chinese; native-speaking instructors help teach these classes. Language exchange programs are offered to students in the 4th and 7th grades; additional courses are regularly organized in preparation for language competitions. International students from age 15 to 18 can apply for three, five or 10-month study programs at Theresianum; as of 2009, students from 27 different countries attended the school. Theresianum sustains a network of 18 international partner schools.

=== Extra-curricular activities ===
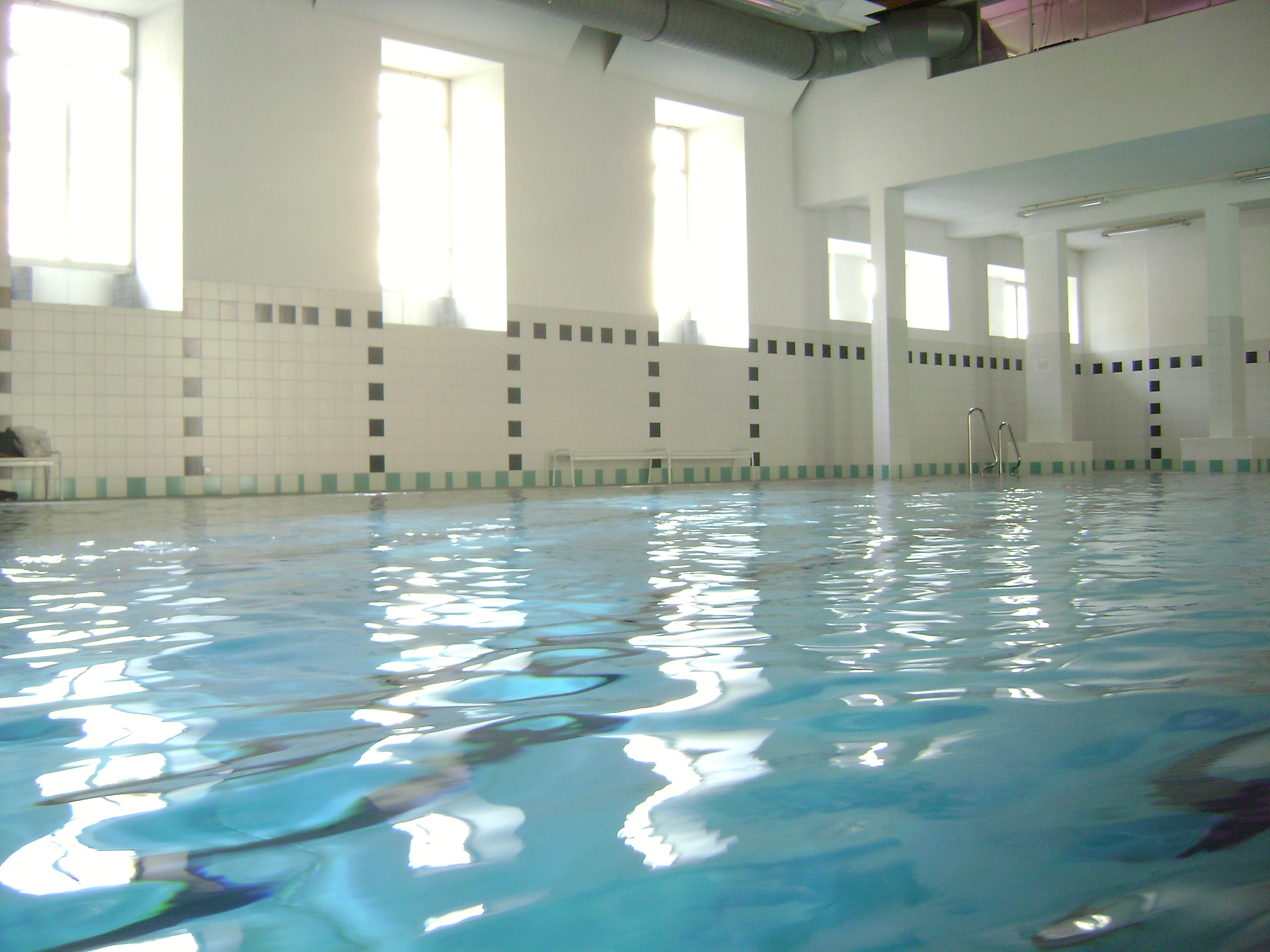
Theresianum's indoor swimming pool

Based on the Theresianum Enrichment Model (THEM), students are offered a set of extra-curricular activities that complement mandatory coursework. These classes include special rhetoric and presentation seminars, community service, cultural and business projects, as well as tailored career advice services. Moreover, Theresianum participates in bi-annually organized Model European Parliament sessions that prepare students for leadership roles in the European Union.

By 1910, a wealth of physical education classes, including swimming, dancing, riding and fencing was offered to students to supplement their academic curriculum. Today, Theresianum offers weekly sports courses across 15 disciplines, organizes three dedicated sports weeks in the 2nd, 3rd and 5th grade, and operates a school-owned ski club; 20 musical instruments are taught at the school.

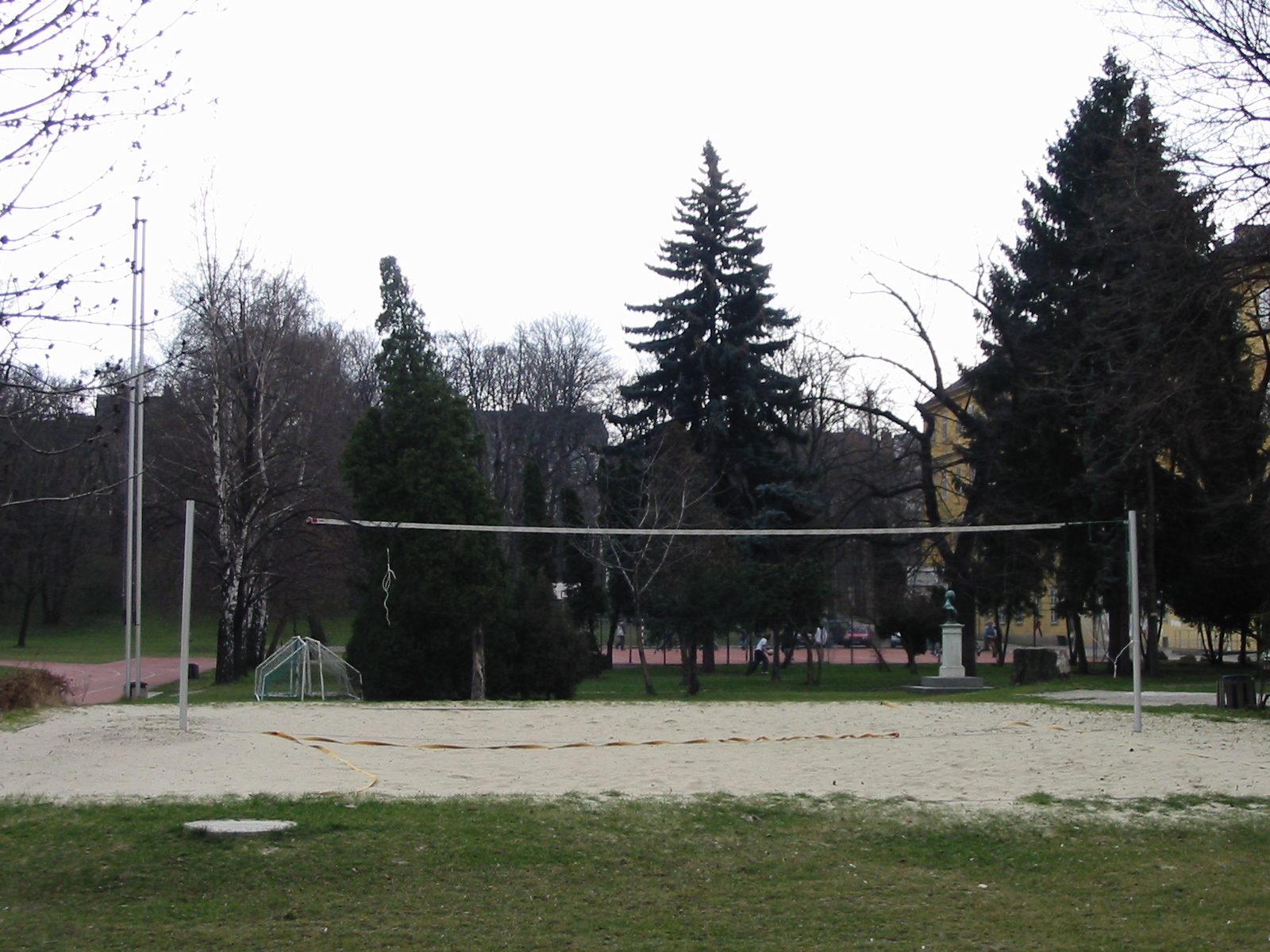
One of the school's beach volleyball courts

=== Boarding school model ===
Theresianum operates as both a primary school and a Gymnasium; as of 2010, 815 students attended 33 Gymnasium classes (i.e., 24.7 students per class) and were taught by 130 instructors (i.e., 6.3 students per instructor). In order to develop well-rounded pupils, Theresianum requires students to attend individual or group study sessions in the afternoons with their instructors. School days typically end between 5:30p.m. and 6:00p.m., depending on the student's age. Grades 5 to 8 used to attend lectures on Saturday mornings now, however, all students have a 5-day school week. 100 students were also enrolled in Theresianum's full-boarding option as of 2007.

=== Facilities ===
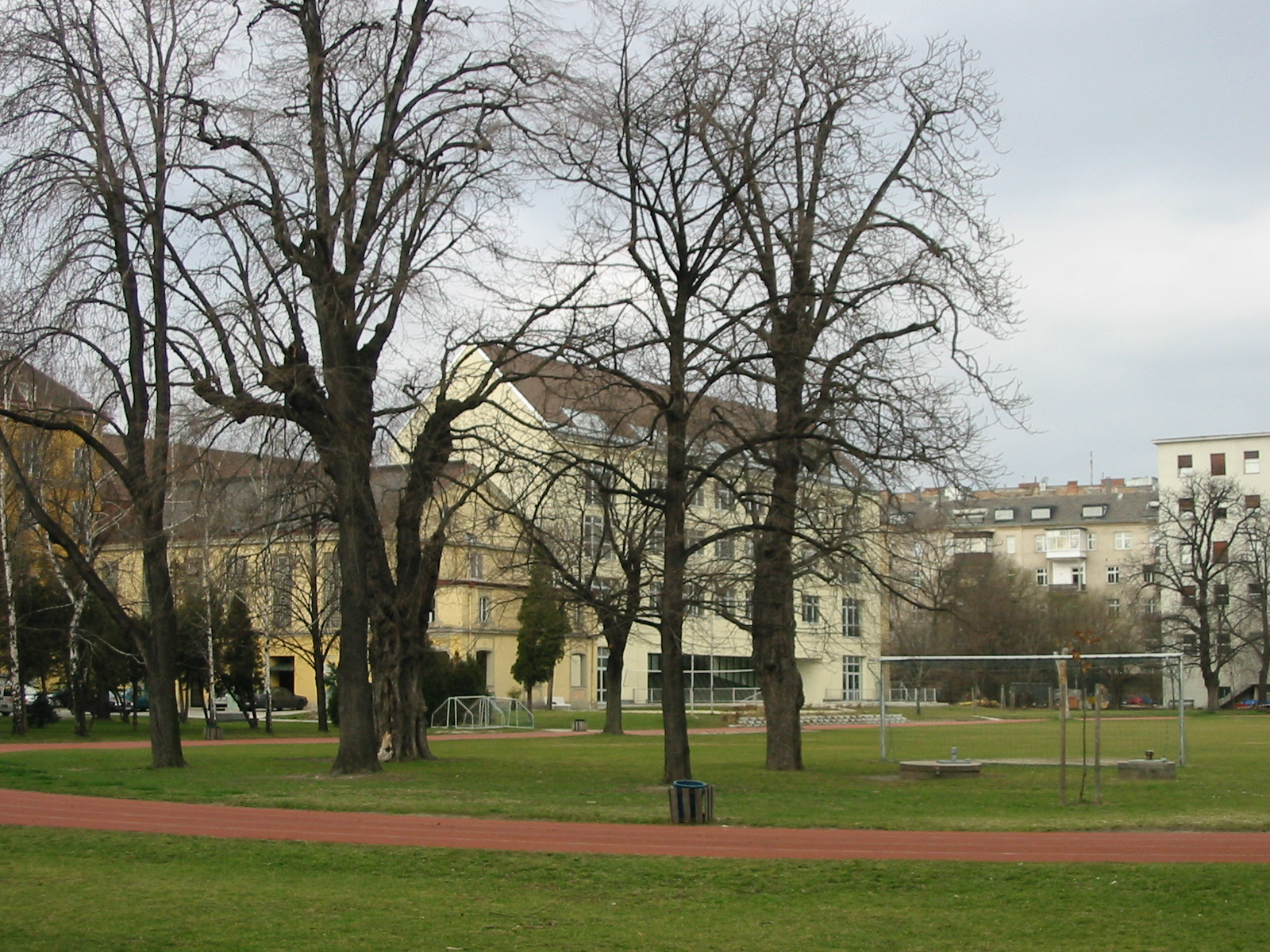
Part of Theresianum's 50,000 m^{2} park

Throughout its history, Theresianum has retained parts of its historic park in the center of Vienna (approx. 50,000 m^{2}), and properties in Süßenbrunn and Strechau, outside the city. The school's sport facilities include an indoor swimming pool, two beach volleyball courts, tennis, soccer and basketball courts, and indoor gyms. All classrooms are equipped with state-of-the-art digital media equipment and laboratories are used for biology, physics and chemistry classes. The school's historic rooms (library, etc.) can be used for special events.

== Notable alumni ==
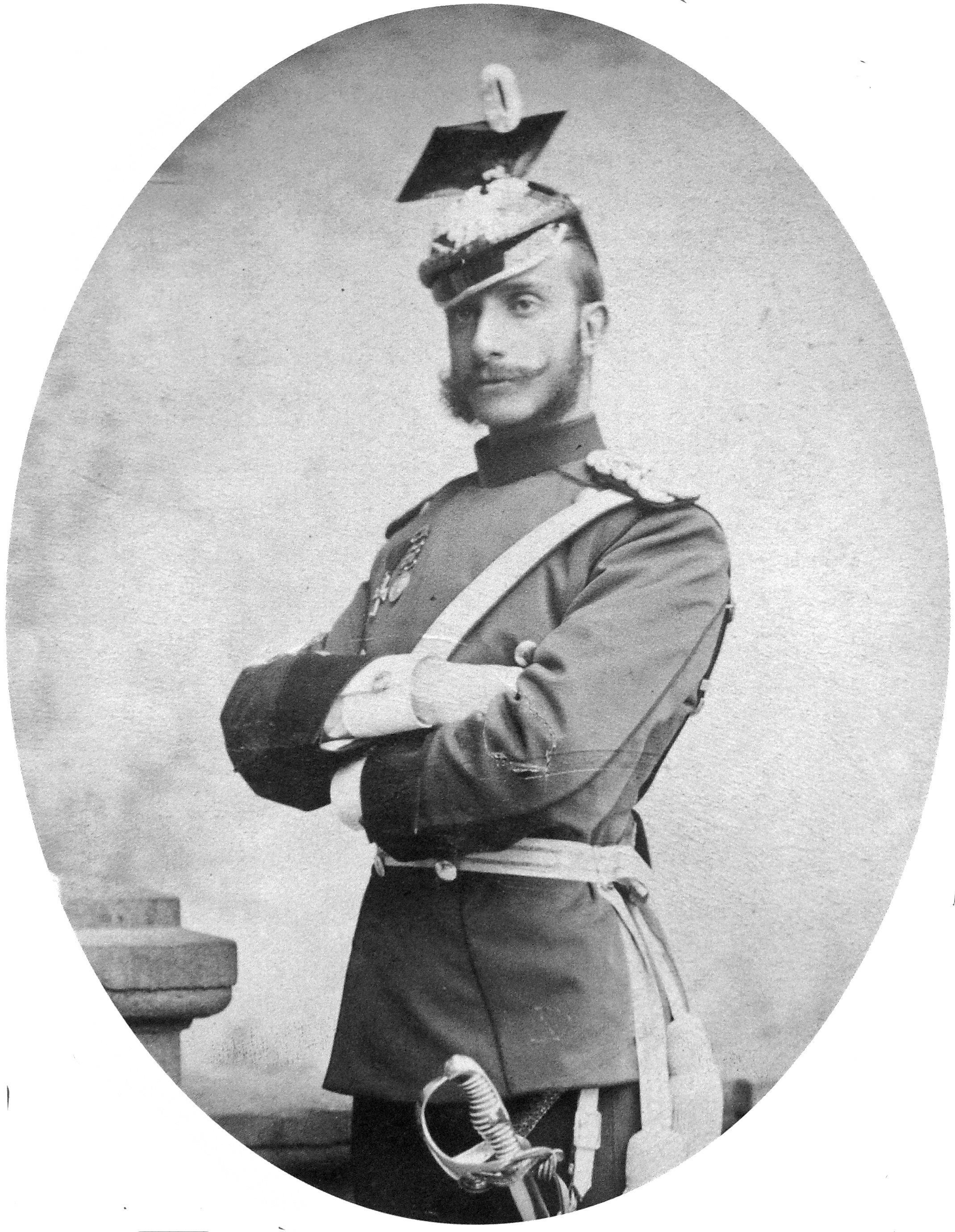
Alfonso XII, King of Spain (1857-1885)

Often referred to as one of Austria's finest schools, Theresianum has shaped over 260 years of Austrian and European history; its graduates include Nobel Prize winners, political leaders, as well as writers and thinkers across a wide array of disciplines:

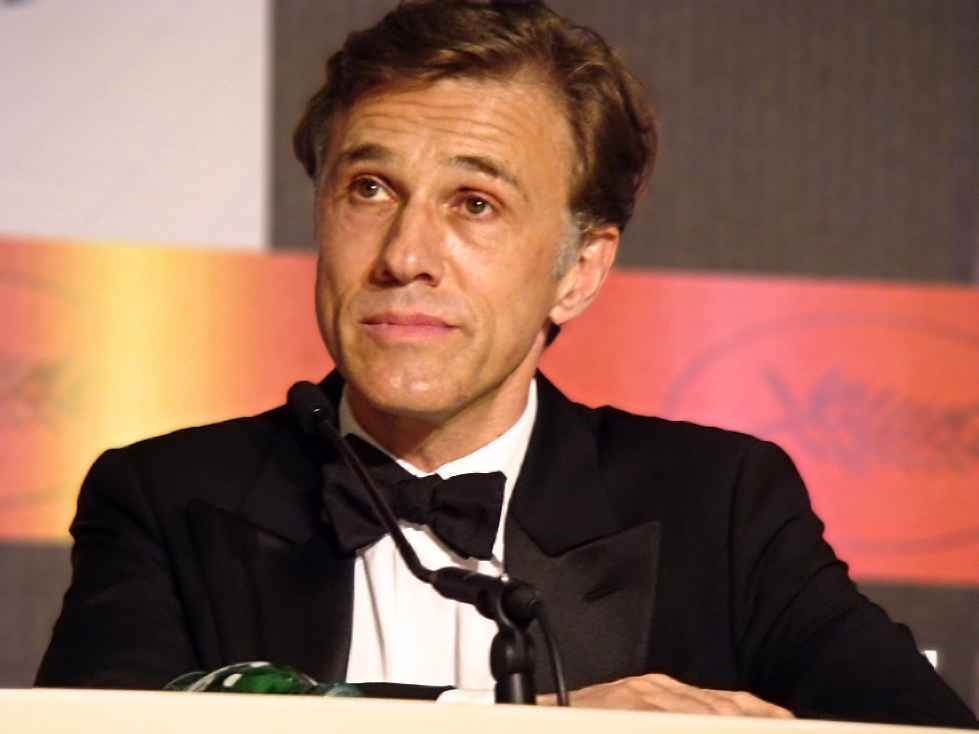
Christoph Waltz

- Francis II Xaver of Salm-Reifferscheid-Krautheim, cardinal and organizer of first successful exhibition on Großglockner
- Ferenc Széchényi, founder of the Hungarian National Library
- Joseph Radetzky von Radetz, Austrian field marshal
- Josip Jelačić, Croatian Ban and Austrian field marshal
- Tivadar Puskás, Hungarian inventor
- Karl Lueger, mayor of Vienna
- Olivier Marquis de Bacquehem, Austrian Minister of Commerce
- Wilhelm Carl Gustav von Doderer, Austrian architect
- Alfonso XII of Spain, King of Spain
- Konstantin Jireček, Czech diplomat
- Peter Altenberg, Austrian writer
- Wlodimir Ledóchowski, General of the Jesuits
- István Bethlen, Hungarian Prime Minister
- Clemens von Pirquet, Austrian scientist
- Kazimierz Twardowski, Polish philosopher
- Franz Nopcsa von Felső-Szilvás, Hungarian paleontologist
- Friedrich Hasenöhrl, Austrian physicist
- Marian Smoluchowski, Polish physicist
- Fritz von Herzmanovsky-Orlando, Austrian author
- Joseph Schumpeter, Austrian economist
- Richard von Coudenhove-Kalergi, founder of the International Paneuropean Union
- Egon Brunswik, Austro-American psychologist
- Max Perutz, Nobel Prize Winner for Chemistry
- Hans Hass, pioneer of aquatic research
- Peter Zinner, Academy Award winner
- Werner Fasslabend, Austrian Minister of Defense
- Christoph Waltz, Austrian actor, two-time winner of the Academy Award for Best Supporting Actor
- Ernst H. Gombrich, Austrian art historian who was the most important of the 20th century
- Ole Otto Paus, Norwegian General
- Dimitrios Droutsas, former Greek foreign minister
- Titu Maiorescu, former Prime Minister of Romania
- Richard Nickl, mathematician
- Johannes Hahn, European Commissioner
- Paul Henreid, Austrian actor
- Dimitri Stancioff, Bulgarian diplomat
- Andrei Markovits, Romanian-born American political scientist
- Şehzade Ertuğrul Osman, former leader of Ottoman Dynasty

== See also ==
- List of Jesuit sites
