= Churchill Professor of Mathematics of Information =

Professorship at the University of Cambridge

The Churchill Professorship of Mathematics of Information (known until November 2022 as the Churchill Professorship of Mathematics for Operational Research) is a professorship in the mathematics of information at the University of Cambridge. It was established in 1966 by a benefaction from Esso in memory of Sir Winston Churchill, who died the previous year, for the promotion of the study of operations research. This was the second professorship established within the Cambridge Statistical Laboratory (the first being the Professorship of Mathematical Statistics).

== List of Churchill Professors ==
- 1967–1994 Peter Whittle
- 1994–2017 Richard Weber
- 2020– Ioannis Kontoyiannis
