= Perla Sousi =

Greek mathematician

Perla Sousi (born 1984) is a Greek mathematician specialising in probability theory, a professor in the Department of Pure Mathematics and Mathematical Statistics (DPMSS) at the University of Cambridge, and a Fellow of Emmanuel College, Cambridge.

== Education and career ==
Sousi was born in 1984 in Athens. After a 2005 bachelor's degree in mathematics from the University of Patras, she first came to the University of Cambridge in 2006 for Part III of the Mathematical Tripos. After study in 2006 and 2007 in France at the École normale supérieure (Paris) and the French Institute for Research in Computer Science and Automation (Inria), she completed her Ph.D. at Cambridge in 2011. Her dissertation, Collisions and detection for random walks and Brownian motion, was supervised by James R. Norris.

She continued at Cambridge as a Junior Research Fellow of Emmanuel College from 2011 to 2014, while also doing postdoctoral research in 2012 at the Mathematical Sciences Research Institute in Berkeley, California. She became a Fellow of Emmanuel College and a research associate of DPMMS in 2014. A readership at Cambridge was established in 2019, and she was made a full professor in 2024.

== Recognition ==
Sousi received a 2025 Whitehead Prize "for her innovative contributions to the study of mixing and cutoff phenomena for Markov chains; to the study of random walks and Brownian motion in fixed and changing environments; and to the development of the potential theory of branching random walks on d-dimensional lattices".
