= Weiwen Miao =

Chinese-American statistician

Weiwen Miao is a Chinese-American statistician, statistics educator, and scholar of legal statistics and nonparametric statistics. She is a professor of mathematics and statistics at Haverford College.

== Education and career ==
Miao has a bachelor's degree in mathematics from Peking University. She went to Tufts University for graduate study in probability theory and statistics, earning a master's degree and a Ph.D. there. Her 1995 doctoral dissertation, Maximum Likelihood Estimation for Exponential Families, was supervised by Marjorie Hahn.

After teaching statistics at Mount Holyoke College and Colby College, and becoming an associate professor at Macalester College, she moved to Haverford College in 2007.

== Recognition ==
Miao was named a Fellow of the American Statistical Association in 2021.
