= Richard Tweedie =

Australian statistician

- Born: 22 August 1947; Leeton, New South Wales, Australia
- Died: 7 June 2001 (aged 53); United States
- Education: Australian National University; University of Cambridge
- Known for: Applied probability Markov chains Statistical modelling
- Awards: Member of the Bernoulli Society
- Scientific career
- Fields: Mathematics; Statistics
- Workplaces: Bond University; Colorado State University; University of Minnesota
- Thesis: R-Theory and Truncation Algorithms for Markov Chains and Processes (1972)
- Doctoral advisor: David George Kendall

Richard Lewis Tweedie (22 August 1947 – 7 June 2001) was an Australian statistician.

== Education ==
After having completed his undergraduate studies and a Master of Arts at the Australian National University, Tweedie moved to Cambridge University, where he obtained his doctorate under the supervision of David George Kendall in 1972. Additionally, in 1986 he was awarded a Doctor of Science degree from the ANU for his major contributions to the theory of Markov chains on a measurable state space.

== Career ==
Tweedie joined the company Siromath in 1981 as general manager, and became its managing director in 1983. He taught at Bond University as Foundation Dean and Foundation Professor of Information Sciences from 1987 to 1992, after which he joined the faculty of Colorado State University (CSU). He was chair of CSU's Department of Statistics from 1992 to 1997, and left CSU to join the faculty of the University of Minnesota in 1999. When he died in 2001 of a heart attack, he was the chair of the University of Minnesota's Division of Biostatistics.

=== Tobacco industry consulting ===
Tweedie did some work as a tobacco industry consultant during his career. This work included presenting his analysis of studies on the health effects of passive smoking at a 1980 meeting, to which he had been invited by the industry.

== Recognition ==
Tweedie was elected as a Fellow of the American Statistical Association in 1997.
