= Christina Goldschmidt =

British mathematician

Christina Anna Goldschmidt is a British probabilist known for her work in probability theory including coalescent theory, random minimum spanning trees, and the theory of random graphs. She is professor of probability in the department of statistics, University of Oxford and a fellow of Lady Margaret Hall, Oxford.

== Education and career ==
Goldschmidt read mathematics at New Hall, Cambridge, and continued at the statistical laboratory of Cambridge for her Ph.D. Her 2004 dissertation, Large Random Hypergraphs, was supervised by James R. Norris.

She did postdoctoral research with Jean Bertoin at Pierre and Marie Curie University, as a Stokes fellow at Pembroke College, Cambridge, and as an EPSRC postdoctoral fellow at Oxford, before becoming an assistant professor in 2009 at the University of Warwick. She returned to Oxford in 2011 and was promoted to full professor in 2017.

== Recognition ==
Goldschmidt was a Medallion Lecturer of the Institute of Mathematical Statistics in 2016. In 2019 she was chosen to become a fellow of the Institute of Mathematical Statistics, "for fundamental contributions to the fields of coalescence and fragmentation theory, and to continuum limits for random trees and graphs".
