= Professor of Statistical Science (Cambridge) =

The Professorship of Statistical Science is a professorship at the University of Cambridge. It was established in 1994 as the third professorship within the Cambridge Statistical Laboratory.

== List of Professors of Statistical Science ==
- 1994–1996, Richard L. Smith
- 2002–2015, L. C. G. Rogers
- 2017–present, Richard Samworth
