= David George Kendall =

English statistician and mathematician

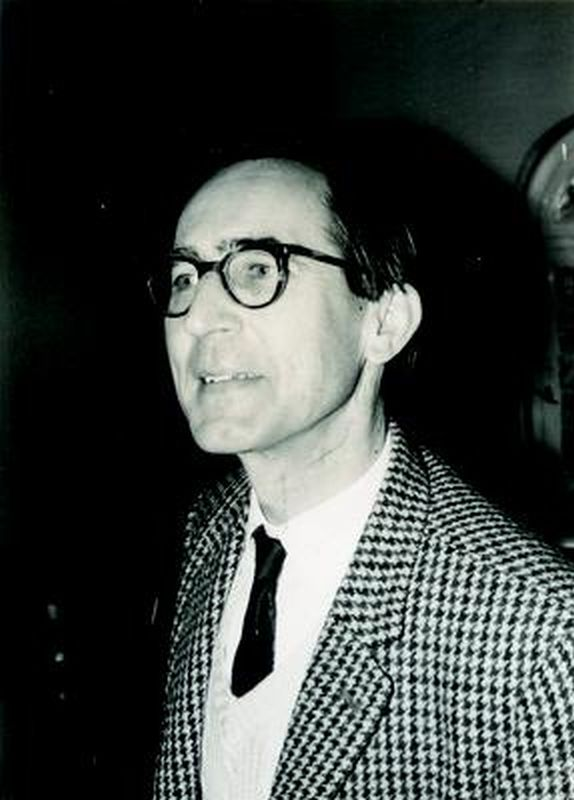
- Born: 15 January 1918; Ripon, West Riding of Yorkshire, England
- Died: 23 October 2007 (aged 89); Cambridge, England
- Awards: Guy Medal (Silver, 1955) (Gold, 1981); Weldon Memorial Prize (1974); Sylvester Medal (1976); Senior Whitehead Prize (1980); De Morgan Medal (1989); Fellow of the Royal Society,
- Scientific career
- Fields: Probability, statistics, statistical shape analysis
- Workplaces: Magdalen College, Oxford; Churchill College, Cambridge
- Doctoral advisor: M. S. Bartlett
- Doctoral students: Nicholas Bingham; Rollo Davidson; John Kingman; Robin Sibson; Bernard Silverman; Richard Tweedie; David Vere-Jones; David Williams; Adrian Baddeley

David George Kendall FRS (15 January 1918 – 23 October 2007) was an English statistician and mathematician, known for his work on probability, statistical shape analysis, ley lines and queueing theory. He spent most of his academic life in the University of Oxford (1946–1962) and the University of Cambridge (1962–1985). He worked with M. S. Bartlett during World War II, and visited Princeton University after the war.

== Life and career ==
David George Kendall was born on 15 January 1918 in Ripon, West Riding of Yorkshire, and attended Ripon Grammar School before attending Queen's College, Oxford, graduating in 1939.

He worked on rocketry at the Ministry of Supply's Projectile Development Establishment during World War II, before moving to Magdalen College, Oxford, in 1946.

In 1962 he was appointed the first Professor of Mathematical Statistics in the Statistical Laboratory, University of Cambridge; in which post he remained until his retirement in 1985. He was elected to a professorial fellowship at Churchill College, and he was a founding trustee of the Rollo Davidson Trust. In 1986, he was awarded an Honorary Degree (Doctor of Science) by the University of Bath.

Kendall was an expert in probability and data analysis, and pioneered statistical shape analysis including the study of ley lines. He defined Kendall's notation for queueing theory.

The Royal Statistical Society awarded him the Guy Medal in Silver in 1955, followed in 1981 by the Guy Medal in Gold. In 1980 the London Mathematical Society awarded Kendall their Senior Whitehead Prize, and in 1989 their De Morgan Medal. He was elected a fellow of the Royal Society in 1964. Kendall also played a key role in founding the Bernoulli Society in 1975, and was its initial president.

He was married to Diana Fletcher from 1952 until his death. They had two sons and four daughters, including Wilfrid Kendall, professor in the Department of Statistics at the University of Warwick, and journalist Bridget Kendall MBE.

== Selected bibliography ==
- Kendall, David G. (1960), "Geometric ergodicity and the theory of queues", in Arrow, Kenneth J.; Karlin, Samuel; Suppes, Patrick (eds.), Mathematical models in the social sciences, 1959: Proceedings of the first Stanford symposium, Stanford mathematical studies in the social sciences, IV, Stanford, California: Stanford University Press, pp. 176–195, ISBN 9780804700214.
