= Richard Samworth =

British statistician

Richard John Samworth FRS
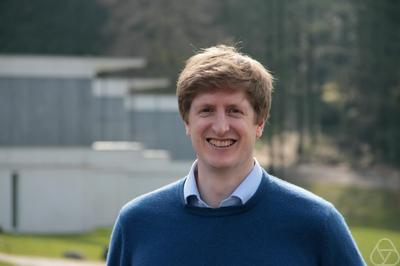
- Born: May 1978 (age 48)
- Education: St John's College, Cambridge
- Scientific career
- Fields: Statistics
- Workplaces: University of Cambridge
- Thesis: Some mathematical and theoretical aspects of the bootstrap (2004)
- Doctoral advisor: Alastair Young

Richard John Samworth (born May 1978) is a British statistician who is the Professor of Statistical Science and the Director of the Statistical Laboratory, University of Cambridge, and a Teaching Fellow of St John's College, Cambridge. He was educated at St John's College, Cambridge. His main research interests are in nonparametric and high-dimensional statistics. Particular topics include shape-constrained density estimation and other nonparametric function estimation problems, nonparametric classification, clustering and regression, the bootstrap and high-dimensional variable selection problems.

== Honours and awards ==
- The Research Prize 2008, Royal Statistical Society
- The Guy Medal in Bronze 2012, Royal Statistical Society
- Philip Leverhulme Prize 2014, Leverhulme Trust
- Fellow, Institute of Mathematical Statistics (2014 election)
- Fellow, American Statistical Association (2015 election)
- The Adams Prize 2017
- The COPSS Presidents' Award 2018
- IMS Medallion Lecture 2018
- Rustagi Memorial Lecture 2021, The Ohio State University
- Fellow, Royal Society (2021 election)
- Arthur Cohen Award & Lecture 2024, Rutgers University
- IMS Grace Wahba Award & Lecture 2025
- The Guy Medal in Silver 2025, Royal Statistical Society
- David Cox Medal 2025

== Selected works ==
- Cannings, Timothy I.; Samworth, Richard J. (2017). "Random-projection ensemble classification". Journal of the Royal Statistical Society, Series B (Statistical Methodology). 79 (4): 959–1035. arXiv:1504.04595. doi:10.1111/rssb.12228.
- Cule, Madeleine; Samworth, Richard; Stewart, Michael (2010). "Maximum likelihood estimation of a multi-dimensional log-concave density". Journal of the Royal Statistical Society, Series B (Statistical Methodology). 72 (5): 545–607. arXiv:0804.3989. doi:10.1111/j.1467-9868.2010.00753.x. S2CID 1524045.
- Fan, J., Samworth, R. and Wu, Y. (2009), Ultrahigh dimensional feature selection: beyond the linear model, Journal of Machine Learning Research, 10, 2013–2038.
- Hall, Peter; Park, Byeong U.; Samworth, Richard J. (2008). "Choice of neighbor order in nearest-neighbor classification". The Annals of Statistics. 36 (5): 2135–2152. arXiv:0810.5276. doi:10.1214/07-AOS537.
