= David Williams (mathematician) =

Welsh mathematician

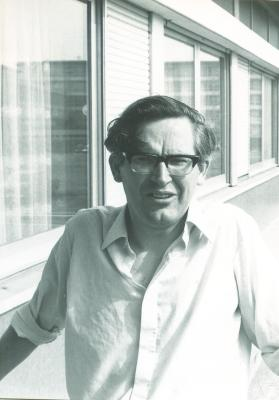
- Williams in 1975
- Born: Gower Peninsula, Swansea, UK
- Education: Jesus College, Oxford
- Known for: Path decomposition of Brownian excursions
- Scientific career
- Workplaces: Stanford University; University of Durham; University of Cambridge; University College of Swansea; University of Bath
- Thesis: Random time substitution in Markov chains (1962)
- Doctoral advisor: D. G. Kendall and G. E. H. Reuter
- Doctoral students: Martin Baxter; Chris Rogers

David Williams FRS is a Welsh mathematician who works in probability theory.

== Early life and education ==
David Williams was born at Gorseinon, near Swansea, Wales. He was educated at Gowerton Grammar School, winning a mathematics scholarship to Jesus College, Oxford, and went on to obtain a DPhil under the supervision of David George Kendall and Gerd Edzard Harry Reuter, with a thesis titled Random time substitution in Markov chains.

== Career ==
Williams held posts at the Stanford University (1962–63), University of Durham, University of Cambridge (1966–69), and at Swansea University (1969–85), where he was promoted to a personal chair in 1972.

In 1985, he was elected to the Professorship of Mathematical Statistics, University of Cambridge, where he remained until 1992, serving as Director of the Statistical Laboratory between 1987 and 1991. Following this, he held the Chair of Mathematical Sciences jointly with the Mathematics and Statistics Groups at the University of Bath.

In 1999, he returned to Swansea University, where he currently holds a Research Professorship.

Williams's research interests encompass Brownian motion, diffusions, Markov processes, martingales and Wiener–Hopf theory. Recognition for his work includes being elected Fellow of the Royal Society in 1984, where he was cited for his achievements on the construction problem for Markov chains and on path decompositions for Brownian motion, and being awarded the London Mathematical Society's Pólya Prize in 1994.

One of his main discoveries is the decomposition of Brownian paths with respect to their maximum.

He is the author of Probability With Martingales and Weighing the Odds, and co-author (with L. C. G. Rogers) of both volumes of Diffusions, Markov Processes and Martingales.

== Books ==
- Diffusions, Markov processes, and martingales, Wiley 1979; 2nd. edn. with L. C. G. Rogers: Diffusions, Markov processes, and martingales, Volume One: Foundations, Wiley 1995; reprinting of 2nd edn. Cambridge University Press 2000
- with L. C. G. Rogers: Diffusions, Markov processes, and martingales, Volume Two: Itō calculus, Wiley 1988; 2nd edn. Cambridge University Press 2000
- Probability with martingales, Cambridge Mathematical Textbooks, Cambridge University Press 1991
- Weighing the Odds: a course in probability and statistics, Cambridge University Press 2001
- ed. with J. C. R. Hunt, O. M. Phillips: Turbulence and stochastic processes. Kolmogorov´s ideas 50 years on, London, Royal Society 1991
