= David Vere-Jones =

New Zealand statistician and probabilist (1936–2024)

David Vere-Jones FRSNZ
- Born: 17 April 1936; Croydon, England
- Died: 31 October 2024 (aged 88); Wellington, New Zealand
- Education: Magdalen College, Oxford
- Occupation: Mathematical statistician
- Relatives: Peter Vere-Jones (brother)
- Scientific career
- Workplaces: Australian National University; Victoria University of Wellington
- Thesis: Topics in the Theory of Probability (1962)
- Doctoral advisor: David George Kendall

David Vere-Jones FRSNZ (17 April 1936 – 31 October 2024) was a New Zealand statistician and probabilist, known in particular for his work on earthquake forecasting.

== Early life and education ==
Vere-Jones was born in Croydon, England, on 17 April 1936. He earned a Master of Science degree with first-class honours at Victoria University College in Wellington, New Zealand, graduating in 1958, and won a Rhodes Scholarship to Magdalen College, Oxford. He obtained his doctorate in 1962 at Oxford under the supervision of David George Kendall, with a thesis entitled Topics in the Theory of Probability.

== Career ==
Vere-Jones worked from 1962 to 1964 at the Laboratory of Applied Mathematics of the Ministry of Scientific and Industrial Research (DSIR). From 1965 to 1969, he worked in the Department of Statistics, Institute of Advanced Studies, at the Australian National University in Canberra. From 1970 to 2000, he was professor of mathematics at Victoria University of Wellington. He then retired and founded a company, Statistics Research Associates Limited, of which he was a director until 2009. Vere-Jones founded the Mathematical Society of New Zealand in 1974 and was its first president.

== Death ==
Vere-Jones died in Wellington on 31 October 2024, at the age of 88.

== Prizes and distinctions ==
In 1982, Vere-Jones was elected a Fellow of the Royal Society of New Zealand (FRSNZ). In 1995, he received the Henri Willem Methorst medal from the International Statistical Institute. In 1999, he was awarded the New Zealand Science and Technology Gold Medal. In 2009 he was award the New Zealand Statistical Association's Campbell Award. In 2014, he received the Royal Society of New Zealand's Jones Medal, "for his work in statistics, both his groundbreaking work on earthquake forecasting and his contribution to the teaching of statistics and mathematics in New Zealand".
