= Richard Weber (mathematician) =

Richard Weber MMC
- Born: 25 February 1953 (age 73)
- Education: University of Cambridge
- Awards: Mayhew Prize (1975)
- Scientific career
- Fields: operations research
- Thesis: The Optimal Organization of Multiserver Systems (1980)
- Doctoral advisor: Peter Nash
- Website: http://www.statslab.cam.ac.uk/~rrw1/

Richard Robert Weber (born 25 February 1953) is a mathematician working in operational research. He is Emeritus Churchill Professor of Mathematics for Operational Research in the Statistical Laboratory, University of Cambridge. He was admitted to The Magic Circle in 2025.

Weber was educated at Walnut Hills High School, Solihull School and Downing College, Cambridge. He graduated in 1974, and completed his PhD in 1980 under the supervision of Peter Nash. He has been on the faculty of the University of Cambridge since 1978, and a fellow of Queens' College since 1977 where he has been Vice President from 1996–2007 and again from 2018–2020. He was appointed Churchill Professor in 1994, and he became Emeritus Churchill Professor on retirement in 2017. He was Director of the Statistical Laboratory from 1999 to 2009, and was a trustee of the Rollo Davidson Trust.

He works on the mathematics of large complex systems subject to uncertainty. He has made contributions to stochastic scheduling, Markov decision processes, queueing theory, the probabilistic analysis of algorithms, the theory of communications pricing and control, and rendezvous search.

Weber and his co-authors were awarded the 2007 INFORMS prize for their paper on the online bin packing algorithm.

== Selected publications ==
- Courcoubetis, C.; Weber, R. R. (2003). Pricing Communication Networks: Economics, Technology and Modelling. Wiley. ISBN 978-0-470-85130-2.
- Csirik, J.; Johnson, D. S.; Kenyon, C.; Orlin, J. B.; Shor, P. W.; Weber, R. R. (2006). "On the sum-of-squares algorithm for bin packing". Journal of the ACM. 53 (1): 1–65. arXiv:cs/0210013. doi:10.1145/1120582.1120583. S2CID 103436.
- Courcoubetis, C.; Weber, R. R. (2006). "Incentives for large peer-to-peer systems". IEEE Journal on Selected Areas in Communications. 24 (5): 1034–1049. doi:10.1109/JSAC.2006.872885. S2CID 6977430.
- Gittins, J. C.; Glazebrook, K. D.; Weber, R. R. (2011). Multi-Armed Bandit Allocation Indices (second ed.). Wiley. ISBN 978-0-470-67002-6.
- Weber, Richard (2012). "Optimal symmetric rendezvous search on three locations". Mathematics of Operations Research. 37: 111–122. doi:10.1287/moor.1110.0528. S2CID 18219038.
