= James R. Norris =

British mathematician

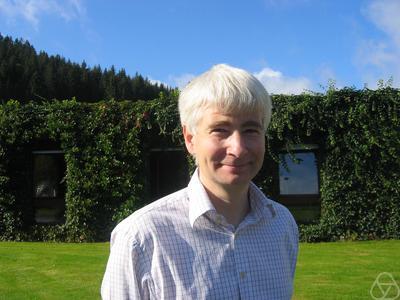
- Norris at Oberwolfach, 2007
- Born: 29 August 1960 (age 66)
- Education: Hertford College, Oxford; Wolfson College, Oxford
- Awards: E. O. Lawrence Award (1990); Rollo Davidson Prize (1997)
- Scientific career
- Workplaces: Swansea University; University of Cambridge
- Thesis: Malliavin Calculus (1985)
- Doctoral advisor: David Edwards
- Doctoral students: Christina Goldschmidt; Perla Sousi
- Website: www.statslab.cam.ac.uk/~james/

James Ritchie Norris (born 29 August 1960) is a mathematician working in probability theory and stochastic analysis. He is the Professor of Stochastic Analysis in the Statistical Laboratory, University of Cambridge.

He has made contributions to areas of mathematics connected to probability theory and mathematical analysis, including Malliavin calculus, heat kernel estimates, and mathematical models for coagulation and fragmentation. He was awarded the Rollo Davidson Prize in 1997.

Norris was an undergraduate at Hertford College, Oxford where he graduated in 1981. He completed his D.Phil in 1985 at Wolfson College, Oxford under the supervision of David Edwards. He was a research assistant from 1984 to 1985 at the University College of Swansea before moving in 1985 to a lectureship at Cambridge University and a Fellowship of Churchill College, Cambridge. He was appointed Professor of Stochastic Analysis in 2005. He is the director of the Statistical Laboratory, a trustee of the Rollo Davidson Trust and co-director of the Cambridge Centre for Analysis.

== Selected publication ==
- Norris, J. R. (28 February 1997). Markov Chains. Cambridge University Press. doi:10.1017/cbo9780511810633. ISBN 978-0-521-48181-6.
