= Giorgi Khmaladze =

Georgian architect

- Born: Georgia
- Education: Harvard University, Graduate School of Design
- Occupation: Architect
- Awards: Georgian International Awards (2010); ArchiAwards (2012); ArchDaily's Building of the Year Award (2014)
- Practice: Giorgi Khmaladze Architects

Giorgi Khmaladze is a Georgian architect graduated in Architecture from the Tbilisi State Academy of Arts, and a Master of Architecture by the Harvard Graduate School of Design in 2012.

== Career ==
Giorgi Khmaladze heads Giorgi Khmaladz Architects which acts in all areas of architectural design and in its most varied scales: objects, interiors, architecture and cities.

== Awards ==
- ArchDaily's Building of the Year Award 2014 - Commercial Architecture - Fuel Station + McDonalds.
- ArchiAwards 2012 – Best Housing Project - Singapore Waterfront.
- Georgian International Awards 2010 – Best Public Interior - Prego Restaurant.

== Selected projects ==
Some of his best-known works are the Georgian National Pavilion for the Shanghai Expo 2010 and the Fuel Station + McDonalds in Batumi, Georgia
