= Sadleirian Professor of Pure Mathematics =

Named professorship at the University of Cambridge

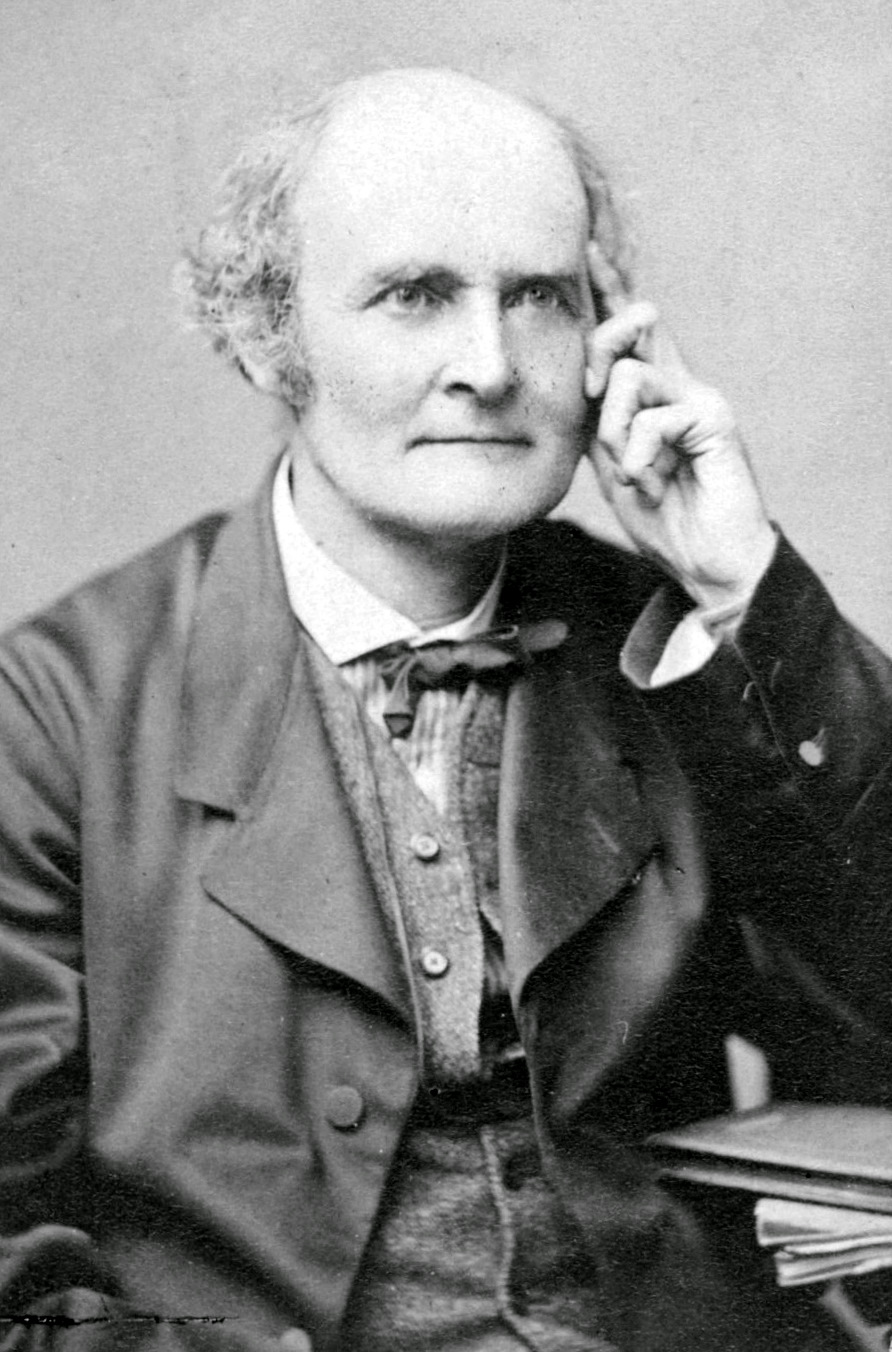
Arthur Cayley, mathematician

The Sadleirian Professorship of Pure Mathematics, originally spelled in the statutes and for the first two professors as Sadlerian, is a professorship in pure mathematics within the DPMMS at the University of Cambridge. It was founded on a bequest from Lady Mary Sadleir for lectureships "for the full and clear explication and teaching that part of mathematical knowledge commonly called algebra". She died in 1706 and lectures began in 1710 but eventually these failed to attract undergraduates. In 1860 the foundation was used to establish the professorship. On 10 June 1863 Arthur Cayley was elected with the statutory duty "to explain and teach the principles of pure mathematics, and to apply himself to the advancement of that science." The stipend attached to the professorship was modest although it improved in the course of subsequent legislation.

== List of Sadlerian Lecturers of Pure Mathematics ==
- 1746–1769 William Ludlam
- 1826–1835 Lawrence Stephenson

== List of Sadleirian Lecturers of Pure Mathematics ==
- 1845–1847 Arthur Scratchley
- 1847–1857 George Ferns Reyner
- 1851 Stephen Hanson
- 1855–1858 William Charles Green
- 1857–1864 John Robert Lunn

== List of Sadleirian Professors of Pure Mathematics ==
- 1863–1895 Arthur Cayley
- 1895–1910 Andrew Russell Forsyth
- 1910–1931 E. W. Hobson
- 1931–1942 G. H. Hardy
- 1945–1953 Louis Mordell
- 1953–1967 Philip Hall
- 1967–1986 J. W. S. Cassels
- 1986–2012 John H. Coates
- 2013–2014 Vladimir Markovic
- 2017–2021 Emmanuel Breuillard
- 2024– Oscar Randal-Williams

== Sources ==
- Obituary Notices of Fellows Deceased. (1895). Proceedings of the Royal Society of London, 58, I-Lx. Retrieved from https://www.jstor.org/stable/115800 (Obituary of Arthur Cayley written by Andrew Forsyth).
- University of Cambridge DPMMS https://web.archive.org/web/20160624155328/http://www.admin.cam.ac.uk/offices/academic/secretary/professorships/sadleirian.pdf
