= Jushan Bai =

Chinese American economist

Academic background
- Education: University of California, Berkeley (Ph.D.); Pennsylvania State University (M.A.); Nankai University (B.A.)

Academic work
- Discipline: Econometrics
- Institutions: Columbia University
- Website: Information at IDEAS / RePEc

Jushan Bai (Chinese: 白聚山) is a Chinese American economist. He is a professor of economics at Columbia University.

== Biography ==
Bai received his B.A. from Nankai University in 1985, M.A. from Pennsylvania State University in 1988, and Ph.D. from University of California, Berkeley in 1992. He taught at Massachusetts Institute of Technology, Boston College, and New York University before joining the Columbia faculty in 2008.

Bai specializes in econometrics and is hailed as one of the most prominent economists of Chinese descent by the Chinese press. He was elected a fellow of the Econometric Society in 2013.
