= Richard Nickl =

Austrian mathematician (born 1980)

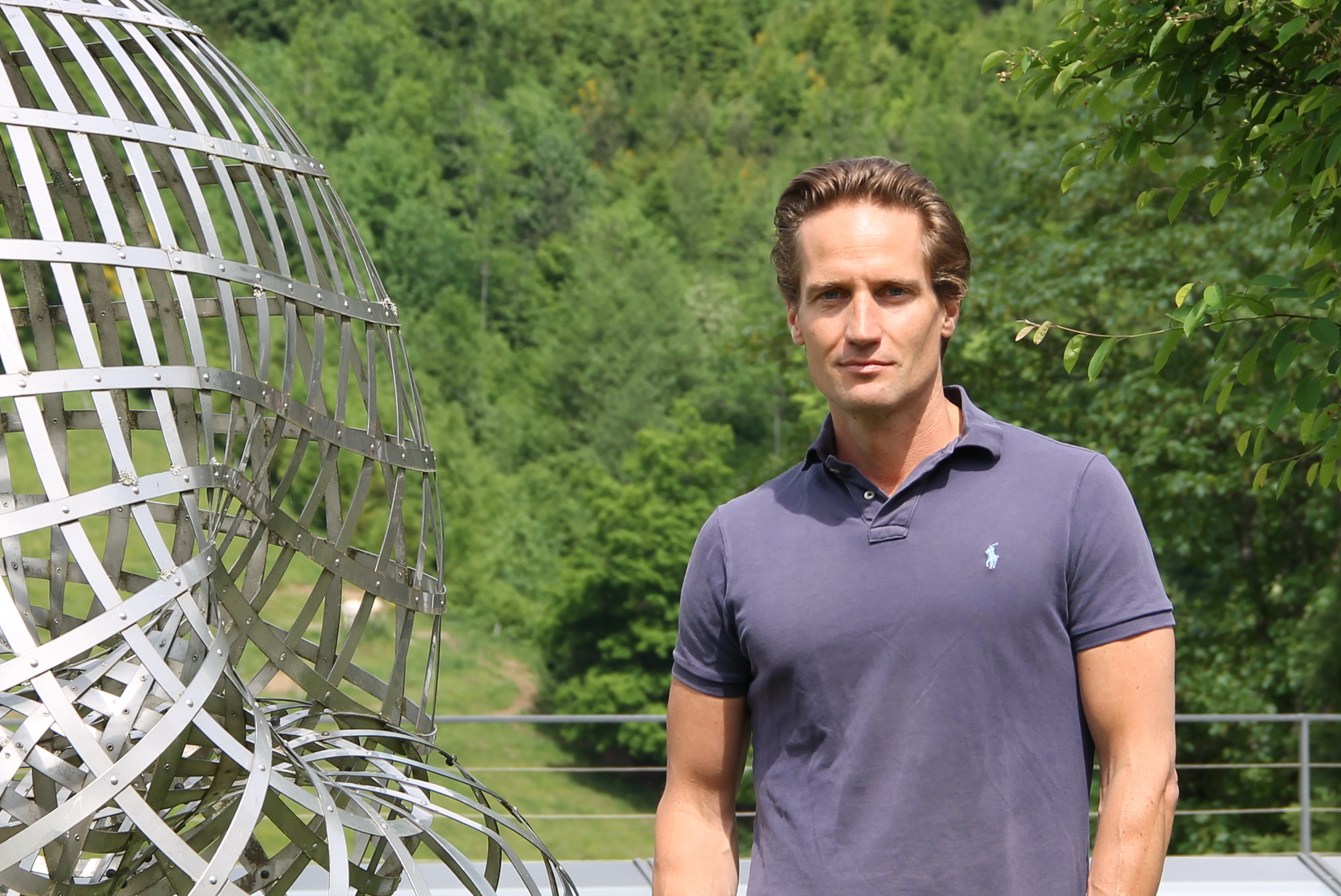
- Born: 13 June 1980 (age 46); Vienna, Austria
- Education: University of Vienna
- Scientific career
- Workplaces: University of Cambridge

Richard Nickl (born 13 June 1980) is an Austrian mathematician and Professor of Mathematical Statistics at the University of Cambridge. He is a fellow of Gonville and Caius College.

He grew up in Vienna, attended secondary school at the Theresianum there (graduating in 1998 with distinction) and obtained his academic degrees from the University of Vienna, including a PhD in 2005. He has made fundamental contributions to various areas of mathematical statistics; including non-parametric and high-dimensional statistics, empirical process theory, and Bayesian inference for statistical inverse problems and partial differential equations. Jointly with Evarist Giné, he is the author of the book `Mathematical foundations of infinite-dimensional statistical models', published with Cambridge University Press, which won the 2017 PROSE Award for best monograph in the mathematics category. He was an invited speaker at the 2022 International Congress of Mathematicians (ICM) and at the 8th European Congress of Mathematics (ECM). He has been awarded the 2017 Ethel Newbold Prize of the Bernoulli Society as well as a Consolidator Grant and an Advanced Grant by the European Research Council.

== Selected publications ==
- Evarist Giné & Richard Nickl, Mathematical foundations of infinite-dimensional statistical models, Cambridge University Press (2016)
- Richard Nickl, Bayesian non-linear statistical inverse problems, European Mathematical Society Press (2023)
