= Professor of Mathematical Statistics (Cambridge) =

The Professorship of Mathematical Statistics at the University of Cambridge was established in 1961 with the support of the Royal Statistical Society and the aid of donations from various companies and banks. It was the first professorship in the Statistical Laboratory, and the first in Cambridge University explicitly intended for the study of statistics. Until 1973 the professor was ex officio Director of the Statistical Laboratory.

== List of professors of mathematical statistics ==
- 1962–1985 David Kendall
- 1985–1992 David Williams
- 1992– Geoffrey Grimmett
