= Faculty of Mathematics, University of Cambridge =

Mathematics research and teaching centre in Cambridge, England

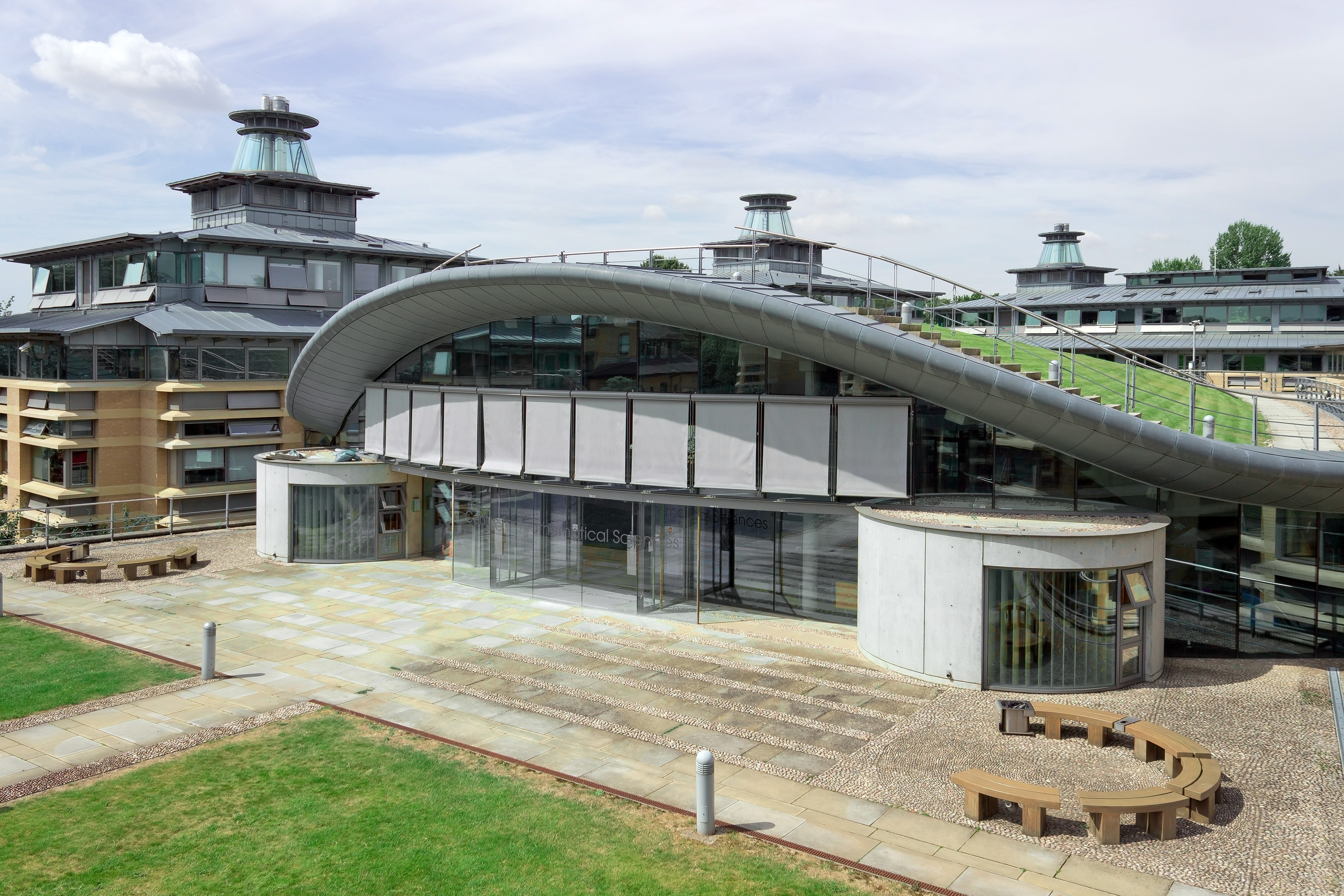
Centre for Mathematical Sciences, Cambridge

The Faculty of Mathematics at the University of Cambridge comprises the Department of Pure Mathematics and Mathematical Statistics (DPMMS) and the Department of Applied Mathematics and Theoretical Physics (DAMTP). It is housed in the Centre for Mathematical Sciences site in West Cambridge, alongside the Isaac Newton Institute. Many distinguished mathematicians have been members of the faculty.

== Some current members ==
=== DPMMS ===
- Béla Bollobás
- John Coates
- Thomas Forster
- Timothy Gowers
- Peter Johnstone
- Imre Leader
- Gabriel Paternain

==== Statistical Laboratory ====
- John Aston
- Geoffrey Grimmett
- Frank Kelly
- Ioannis Kontoyiannis
- Richard Nickl
- James Norris
- Richard Samworth
- David Spiegelhalter
- Richard Weber

=== DAMTP ===
- Natalia Berloff, quantum fluids
- Gary Gibbons
- Julia Gog, professor of mathematical biology
- Raymond E. Goldstein
- Rich Kerswell
- Paul Linden
- Michael Green
- Peter Haynes, fluid dynamicist
- John Hinch, fluid dynamicist, retired 2014
- Richard Jozsa
- Hugh Osborn
- John Papaloizou
- Malcolm Perry
- David Tong, theoretical physicist
- Paul Townsend
- Grae Worster, editor for the Journal of Fluid Mechanics
- Mihaela van der Schaar
- Carola-Bibiane Schönlieb

== Pure Mathematics and Mathematical Statistics ==
The Department of Pure Mathematics and Mathematical Statistics (DPMMS) was created in 1964 under the headship of Sir William Hodge. It was housed in a converted warehouse at 16 Mill Lane, adjacent to its sister department DAMTP, until its move around 2000 to the present Centre for Mathematical Sciences where it occupies Pavilions C, D, and E.

=== Heads of department ===
- 1964–1969 W. V. D. Hodge
- 1969–1984 J. W. S. Cassels
- 1984–1991 D. J. H. Garling
- 1991–1997 John H. Coates
- 1997–2002 W. B. R. Lickorish
- 2002–2007 Geoffrey Grimmett
- 2007–2014 Martin Hyland
- 2014–2018 Gabriel Paternain
- 2018–2023 James Norris
- since 2023 Ivan Smith

=== Statistical Laboratory ===
The Statistical Laboratory is a Sub-Department of DPMMS. It was created in 1947 with accommodation in a "temporary hut", and was established on 21 March 1953 within the Faculty of Mathematics. It moved in 1958 to the basement of the new Chemistry Department in Lensfield Road, and then formed part of the new Department (DPMMS) in Mill Lane on its creation in 1964. It occupies Pavilion D of the Centre for Mathematical Sciences.

==== Directors of the Statistical Laboratory ====
- 1953–1956 John Wishart
- 1956–1957 Henry Daniels, Acting Director
- 1957–1960 Dennis Lindley
- 1960–1962 Morris Walker, Acting Director
- 1962–1973 David Kendall
- 1973–1987 Peter Whittle
- 1987–1991 David Williams
- 1991–1993 Frank Kelly
- 1994–2000 Geoffrey Grimmett
- 2000–2009 Richard Weber
- 2009–2017 James Norris
- 2017– Richard Samworth

== Applied Mathematics and Theoretical Physics ==
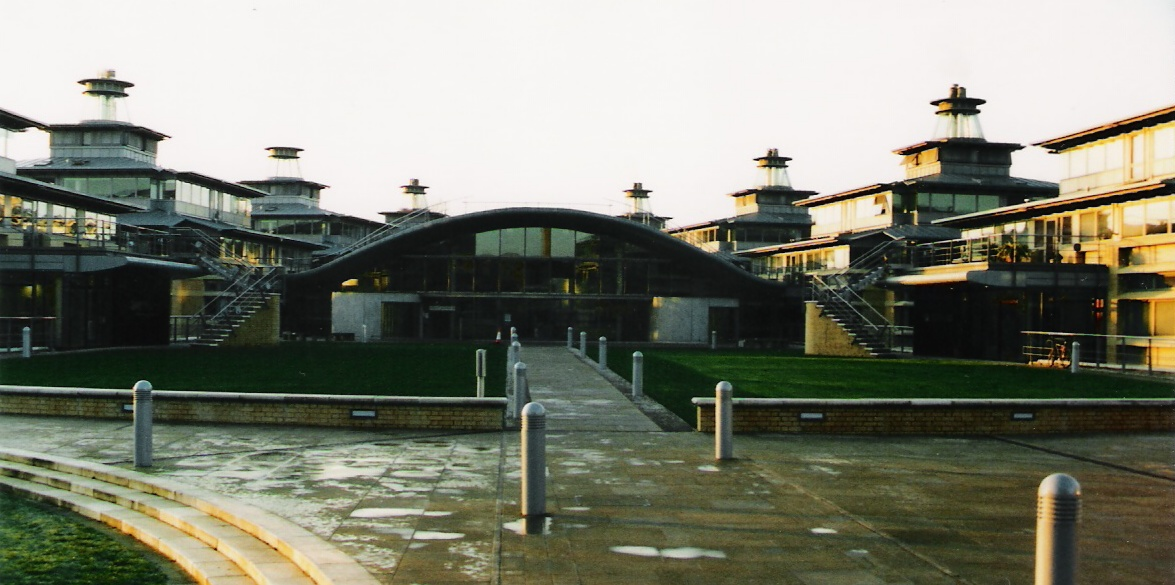
Department of Applied Mathematics & Theoretical Physics is based at Centre for Mathematical Sciences.

The Department of Applied Mathematics and Theoretical Physics (DAMTP) was founded by George Batchelor in 1959, and for many years was situated on Silver Street, in the former office buildings of Cambridge University Press. However since the opening of the Isaac Newton Institute in 1991, the Department has been located at the Centre for Mathematical Sciences (Cambridge). Theoretical Physics (including cosmology, relativity, and high energy physics) occupies most of Pavilion B, while Applied Mathematics (including fluid dynamics and solid mechanics) occupies most of Pavilions F, G, and H.

=== Heads of department ===
- 1959–1983 George Batchelor
- 1983–1991 Keith Moffatt
- 1991–2000 David Crighton
- 2000–2005 Timothy J. Pedley
- 2005–2015 Peter Haynes
- 2015–2020 Nigel Peake
- 2020–present Colm-Cille Patrick Caulfield

== See also ==
- Mathematical Tripos
- Wrangler (University of Cambridge)
- List of Cambridge mathematicians
- Chairs associated with the Faculty:
  - Lucasian Professor of Mathematics
  - Lowndean Professor of Astronomy and Geometry
  - Rouse Ball Professor of Mathematics
  - Sadleirian Professor of Pure Mathematics
  - Herchel Smith Professorship of Pure Mathematics
  - Professorship of Mathematical Statistics
  - Churchill Professorship of Mathematics of Information
  - Professorship of Statistical Science
  - Winton Professorship of the Public Understanding of Risk
