= Empirical process =

Stochastic process in probability theory

In probability theory, an empirical process is a stochastic process that characterizes the deviation of the empirical distribution function from its expectation. In mean field theory, limit theorems (as the number of objects becomes large) are considered and generalise the central limit theorem for empirical measures. Applications of the theory of empirical processes arise in non-parametric statistics.

== Definition ==
For X_{1}, X_{2}, ... X_{n} independent and identically-distributed random variables with values in $\mathbb{R}$ and cumulative distribution function F(x), the empirical distribution function is defined as

$$F_n(x)=\frac{1}{n}\sum_{i=1}^n I_{(-\infty,x]}(X_i),$$

where I_{C} is the indicator function of the set C.

For every (fixed) x, F_{n}(x) is a sequence of random variables which converge to F(x) almost surely by the strong law of large numbers. That is, F_{n} converges to F pointwise. Glivenko and Cantelli strengthened this result by proving uniform convergence of F_{n} to F by the Glivenko–Cantelli theorem.

A centered and scaled version of the empirical measure is the signed measure

$$G_n(A)=\sqrt{n}(P_n(A)-P(A))$$

It induces a map on measurable functions f given by

$$f\mapsto G_n f=\sqrt{n}(P_n-P)f=\sqrt{n}\left(\frac{1}{n}\sum_{i=1}^n f(X_i)-\mathbb{E}f\right)$$

By the central limit theorem, $G_n(A)$ converges in distribution to a normal random variable N(0, P(A)(1 − P(A))) for fixed measurable set A. Similarly, for a fixed function f, $G_nf$ converges in distribution to a normal random variable $N(0,\mathbb{E}(f-\mathbb{E}f)^2)$, provided that $\mathbb{E}f$ and $\mathbb{E}f^2$ exist.

Definition

$\bigl(G_n(c)\bigr)_{c\in\mathcal{C}}$ is called an empirical process indexed by $\mathcal{C}$, a collection of measurable subsets of S.
$\bigl(G_nf\bigr)_{f\in\mathcal{F}}$ is called an empirical process indexed by $\mathcal{F}$, a collection of measurable functions from S to $\mathbb{R}$.

A significant result in the area of empirical processes is Donsker's theorem. It has led to a study of Donsker classes: sets of functions with the useful property that empirical processes indexed by these classes converge weakly to a certain Gaussian process. While it can be shown that Donsker classes are Glivenko–Cantelli classes, the converse is not true in general.

== Example ==
As an example, consider empirical distribution functions. For real-valued iid random variables X_{1}, X_{2}, ..., X_{n} they are given by

$$F_n(x)=P_n((-\infty,x])=P_nI_{(-\infty,x]}.$$

In this case, empirical processes are indexed by a class $\mathcal{C}=\{(-\infty,x]:x\in\mathbb{R}\}.$ It has been shown that $\mathcal{C}$ is a Donsker class, in particular,

$\sqrt{n}(F_n(x)-F(x))$ converges weakly in $\ell^\infty(\mathbb{R})$ to a Brownian bridge B(F(x)) .

== See also ==
- Khmaladze transformation
- Weak convergence of measures
- Glivenko–Cantelli theorem
