= Arcsine law =

Arcsine law may refer to:

- Arcsine distribution
- Arcsine laws (Wiener process), describing one-dimensional random walks
- Erdős arcsine law, concerning the prime divisors of a number
- Arcsine law of Deshouillers–Dress–Tenenbaum, concerning divisors and their logarithmic ratios.
