= Komlós–Major–Tusnády approximation =

In probability theory, the Komlós–Major–Tusnády approximation (also known as the KMT approximation, the KMT embedding, or the Hungarian embedding) refers to one of the two strong embedding theorems: 1) approximation of random walk by a standard Brownian motion constructed on the same probability space, and 2) an approximation of the empirical process by a Brownian bridge constructed on the same probability space. It is named after Hungarian mathematicians János Komlós, Gábor Tusnády, and Péter Major, who proved it in 1975.

== Theory ==
Let $U_1,U_2,\ldots$ be independent uniform (0,1) random variables. Define a uniform empirical distribution function as

$$F_{U,n}(t)=\frac{1}{n}\sum_{i=1}^n \mathbf{1}_{U_i\leq t},\quad t\in [0,1].$$

Define a uniform empirical process as

$$\alpha_{U,n}(t)=\sqrt{n}(F_{U,n}(t)-t),\quad t\in [0,1].$$

The Donsker theorem (1952) shows that $\alpha_{U,n}(t)$ converges in law to a Brownian bridge $B(t).$ Komlós, Major and Tusnády established a sharp bound for the speed of this weak convergence.

Theorem (KMT, 1975) On a suitable probability space for independent uniform (0,1) r.v. $U_1,U_2\ldots$ the empirical process $\{\alpha_{U,n}(t), 0\leq t\leq 1\}$ can be approximated by a sequence of Brownian bridges $\{B_n(t),0\leq t\leq 1\}$ such that

$$P\left\{\sup_{0\leq t\leq 1}|\alpha_{U,n}(t)-B_n(t)|>\frac{1}{\sqrt{n}}(a\log n+x)\right\}\leq b e^{-cx}$$

for all positive integers n and all $x>0$, where a, b, and c are positive constants.

=== Corollary ===
A corollary of that theorem is that for any real iid r.v. $X_1,X_2,\ldots,$ with cdf $F(t),$ it is possible to construct a probability space where independent sequences of empirical processes $\alpha_{X,n}(t)=\sqrt{n}(F_{X,n}(t)-F(t))$ and Gaussian processes $G_{F,n}(t)=B_n(F(t))$ exist such that

$\limsup_{n\to\infty} \frac{\sqrt{n}}{\ln n} \big\| \alpha_{X,n} - G_{F,n} \big\|_\infty < \infty,$ almost surely.
