= Reflection principle (disambiguation) =

In mathematics, a reflection principle may refer to:

- Reflection principle, the principle in set theory that it is possible to find sets that resemble the class of all sets
- Reflection principle (Wiener process), a result about the distribution of the supremum of a Brownian motion
- Law of reflection, the principle that the angle of reflection of light from a surface is the same as the angle of incidence
- Reflection formula, a relation between f(x) and f(a − x) for a function f and a constant a
- Reflection theorem, one of a collection of theorems about the sizes of class groups
- Schwarz reflection principle, a way to extend the domain of definition of an analytic function

== See also ==
- Van Fraassen's reflection principle, a philosophical principle
