= Reflection principle (Wiener process) =

Distribution result for probability mathematics

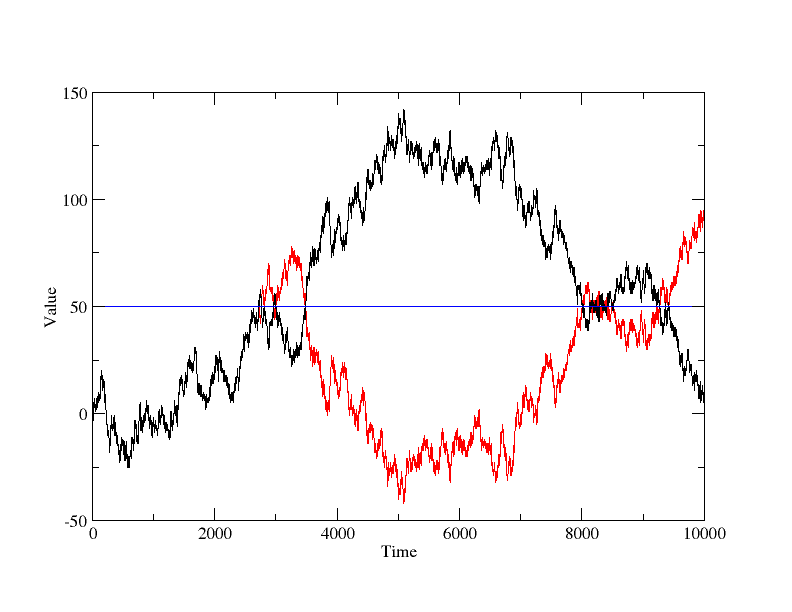
Simulation of Wiener process (black curve). When the process reaches the crossing point at a=50 at t$\approx$3000, both the original process and its reflection (red curve) about the a=50 line (blue line) are shown. After the crossing point, both black and red curves have the same distribution.

In the theory of probability for stochastic processes, the reflection principle for a Wiener process states that if the path of a Wiener process f(t) reaches a value f(s) = a at time t = s, then the subsequent path after time s has the same distribution as the reflection of the subsequent path about the value a. More formally, the reflection principle refers to a theorem concerning the distribution of the supremum of the Wiener process, or Brownian motion. The result relates the distribution of the supremum of Brownian motion up to time t to the distribution of the process at time t. It is a corollary of the strong Markov property of Brownian motion.

== Statement ==
If $(W(t): t \geq 0)$ is a Wiener process, and $a > 0$ is a threshold (also called a crossing point), then the theorem states:

$$\mathbb{P} \left(\sup_{0 \leq s \leq t} W(s) \geq a \right) = 2\mathbb{P}(W(t) \geq a)$$

Assuming $W(0) = 0$ , due to the continuity of Wiener processes, each path (one sampled realization) of Wiener process on $(0,t)$ which finishes at or above value/level/threshold/crossing point $a$ the time $t$ ( $W(t) \geq a$ ) must have crossed (reached) a threshold $a$ ( $W(t_a) = a$ ) at some earlier time $t_a \leq t$ for the first time . (It can cross level $a$ multiple times on the interval $(0,t)$, we take the earliest.)

For every such path, you can define another path $W'(t)$ on $(0,t)$ that is reflected or vertically flipped on the sub-interval $(t_a,t)$ symmetrically around level $a$ from the original path. These reflected paths are also samples of the Wiener process reaching value $W'(t_a) = a$ on the interval $(0,t)$, but finish below $a$. Thus, of all the paths that reach $a$ on the interval $(0,t)$, half will finish below $a$, and half will finish above. Hence, the probability of finishing above $a$ is half that of reaching $a$.

In a stronger form, the reflection principle says that if $\tau$ is a stopping time then the reflection of the Wiener process starting at $\tau$, denoted $(W^\tau(t): t \geq 0)$, is also a Wiener process, where:

$$W^\tau(t) = W(t)\chi_\left\{t \leq \tau\right\} + (2W(\tau) - W(t))\chi_\left\{t > \tau\right\}$$

and the indicator function
$$\chi_{\{t \leq \tau\}}= \begin{cases} 1, & \text{if }t \leq \tau \\ 0, & \text{otherwise }\end{cases}$$
and $\chi_{\{t > \tau\}}$ is defined similarly. The stronger form implies the original theorem by choosing $\tau = \inf\left\{t \geq 0: W(t) = a\right\}$.

== Proof ==
The earliest stopping time for reaching crossing point a, $\tau_a := \inf\left\{t: W(t) = a\right\}$, is an almost surely bounded stopping time. Then we can apply the strong Markov property to deduce that a relative path subsequent to $\tau_a$, given by $X_t := W(t + \tau_a) - a$, is also simple Brownian motion independent of $\mathcal{F}^W_{\tau_a}$. Then the probability distribution for the last time $W(s)$ is at or above the threshold $a$ in the time interval $[0,t]$ can be decomposed as

$$\begin{align}
\mathbb{P}\left(\sup_{0\leq s\leq t}W(s) \geq a\right) & = \mathbb{P}\left(\sup_{0\leq s\leq t}W(s) \geq a, W(t) \geq a\right) + \mathbb{P}\left(\sup_{0\leq s\leq t}W(s) \geq a, W(t) < a\right)\\
& = \mathbb{P}\left(W(t) \geq a\right) + \mathbb{P}\left(\sup_{0\leq s\leq t}W(s) \geq a, W(t) - W(\tau_a) < 0\right)\\
\end{align}$$.

By the strong markov property, $W(t) - W(\tau_a) \overset{\mathcal{D}}{=} W'(t-\tau_a)$ where $W'$ is a second simple brownian motion independent of $\{W(u): 0 \leq u \leq \tau_a\}$. Thus, by independence, the second term becomes:

$$\begin{align}
\mathbb{P}\left(\sup_{0\leq s\leq t}W(s) \geq a, W(t) - W(\tau_a) < 0\right) &=
\mathbb{P}\left(\sup_{0\leq s\leq t}W(s) \geq a, W'(t-\tau_a) < 0\right) \\
&=\mathbb{P}\left(\sup_{0\leq s\leq t}W(s) \geq a\right) \mathbb{P}\left(W'(t-\tau_a) < 0\right)\\
&=\frac{1}{2}\mathbb{P}\left(\sup_{0\leq s\leq t}W(s) \geq a\right) ,
\end{align}$$.

Since $W'(t)$ is a standard Brownian motion independent of $\mathcal{F}^W_{\tau_a}$ and has probability $1/2$ of being less than $0$. The proof of the theorem is completed by substituting this into the second line of the first equation.

$$\begin{align}
\mathbb{P}\left(\sup_{0\leq s\leq t}W(s) \geq a\right) & = \mathbb{P}\left(W(t) \geq a\right) + \frac{1}{2}\mathbb{P}\left(\sup_{0\leq s\leq t}W(s) \geq a\right) \\
\mathbb{P}\left(\sup_{0\leq s\leq t}W(s) \geq a\right) &= 2 \mathbb{P}\left(W(t) \geq a\right)
\end{align}$$.

== Consequences ==
The reflection principle is often used to simplify distributional properties of Brownian motion. Considering Brownian motion on the restricted interval $(W(t): t \in [0,1])$ then the reflection principle allows us to prove that the location of the maxima $t_\text{max}$, satisfying $W(t_\text{max}) = \sup_{0 \leq s \leq 1}W(s)$, has the arcsine distribution. This is one of the Lévy arcsine laws.
