= Über die von der molekularkinetischen Theorie der Wärme geforderte Bewegung von in ruhenden Flüssigkeiten suspendierten Teilchen =

1905 scientific paper by Albert Einstein

"Über die von der molekularkinetischen Theorie der Wärme geforderte Bewegung von in ruhenden Flüssigkeiten suspendierten Teilchen" (English: "On the movement of small particles suspended in a stationary liquid demanded by the molecular-kinetic theory of heat") is the 1905 journal article, by Albert Einstein, that proved the reality of atoms, the modern understanding of which had been proposed in 1808 by John Dalton. It is one of the four groundbreaking papers Einstein published in 1905, in Annalen der Physik, in his miracle year.

In 1827, botanist Robert Brown used a microscope to look at dust grains floating in water. He found that the floating grains were moving about erratically; a phenomenon that became known as "Brownian motion". This was thought to be caused by water molecules knocking the grains about. In 1905, Albert Einstein proved the reality of these molecules and their motions by producing the first statistical physics analysis of Brownian motion. French physicist Jean Perrin used Einstein's results to experimentally determine the mass, and the dimensions, of atoms, thereby conclusively verifying Dalton's atomic theory.

Before this paper, atoms were recognized as a useful concept, but physicists and chemists hotly debated whether atoms were real entities. Einstein's statistical discussion of atomic behavior gave experimentalists a way to count atoms with an ordinary microscope. Wilhelm Ostwald, one of the leaders of the anti-atom school of energeticism, later told Arnold Sommerfeld that he had been converted to a belief in atoms by Einstein's complete explanation of Brownian motion.

The paper also provided the best way up to that time of estimating the Avogadro constant—the corrected value from Einstein's paper was accurate to one significant figure.
