= Brownian bridge =

Gaussian process pinned at both ends

Eight sample paths of a standard Brownian bridge on $[0,1]$.

A Brownian bridge is a random continuous path with fixed values at the beginning and end of a time interval. It can be constructed from Brownian motion by conditioning on those endpoint values. Between the two fixed values the path wanders randomly, and it is most uncertain halfway between them. In computer simulation, Brownian bridges are used to fill in random paths between known points. In statistics, the random error of an empirical distribution function is approximately a Brownian bridge, which is why bridges underlie goodness-of-fit tests such as the Kolmogorov–Smirnov and Cramér–von Mises tests.

Mathematically, a Brownian bridge is a continuous-time Gaussian process. The standard Brownian bridge $B(t)$, $0 \le t \le 1$, has continuous paths that start and end at zero, mean zero, and covariance
$$\operatorname{Cov}\bigl(B(s), B(t)\bigr) = \min(s,t) - st.$$
If $W$ is a standard Brownian motion (a Wiener process), then
$$B(t) = W(t) - t\,W(1)$$
is a standard Brownian bridge, independent of $W(1)$.

The variance $t(1-t)$ is zero at both ends and largest at the midpoint, whereas the variance of Brownian motion keeps growing. A bridge between any two values on any interval is the straight line joining them plus a rescaled standard bridge.

The scaled error of an empirical distribution function converges in distribution to the bridge, and the limiting distributions of the Kolmogorov–Smirnov and Cramér–von Mises statistics are those of the supremum of the bridge's absolute value and of the integral of its square. In simulation, a Brownian path is filled in between times at which its values are known by sampling from the bridge, its conditional distribution given those values. It is also related to other processes, such as the Brownian excursion.

== Definition and basic properties ==
=== Standard Brownian bridge ===
Brownian motion (left) and Brownian bridges (right), 200 paths each, with the mean and ±2 standard deviations

The law of $B$ is that of a standard Brownian motion $W$ conditioned on $W(1) = 0$. This event has probability zero, but the conditional law is well defined as a regular conditional distribution, and is also the limit as $\varepsilon \to 0$ of the laws conditioned on $|W(1)| < \varepsilon$.

A Brownian bridge on $[0, T]$ is obtained from a standard bridge by rescaling, or directly from Brownian motion, as
$$\sqrt{T}\,B(t/T) \quad\text{or}\quad W(t) - \frac{t}{T}\,W(T), \qquad 0 \le t \le T.$$
Its covariance is $\min(s,t) - st/T$.

Left: the covariance $\min(s,t) - st$ as a surface, with level curves every 0.025. Right: the variance $t(1-t)$

For any times $0 < t_1 < \cdots < t_n < 1$, the vector $\bigl(B(t_1), \ldots, B(t_n)\bigr)$ is multivariate normal with mean zero and covariance matrix
$$\Sigma_{ij} = \min(t_i, t_j) - t_i t_j = \min(t_i,t_j)\,\bigl(1 - \max(t_i,t_j)\bigr).$$
In particular, $B(t) \sim \mathcal{N}\bigl(0, t(1-t)\bigr)$. The variance is largest, $\tfrac14$, at the midpoint, and zero at both ends. Being Gaussian, the bridge is determined by its mean and covariance.

The increments of a Brownian bridge are not independent: because the endpoint is fixed, increments over disjoint intervals are negatively correlated. For a bridge on $[0, T]$, increments over disjoint intervals of lengths $h_1$ and $h_2$ have covariance $-h_1 h_2/T$, which follows directly from the covariance function.

=== Conditional distribution and Markov property ===
For $0 \le s < t < 1$, the value at time $t$ given the value at an earlier time $s$ is normal:
$$B(t) \mid B(s) = x \;\sim\; \mathcal{N}\!\left(\frac{1-t}{1-s}\,x,\; \frac{(t-s)(1-t)}{1-s}\right).$$
The conditional mean is linear in $t$, from $x$ at time $s$ to 0 at time 1, where the conditional variance also vanishes. The law of $B(t)$ given the whole path up to time $s$ depends only on $B(s)$: the bridge has the Markov property, and so is a Gauss–Markov process.

=== Symmetries ===
The bridge is symmetric under time reversal: $B(1-t)$ is again a standard Brownian bridge. It is also cyclically exchangeable: identifying the two zero endpoints, cutting the path at a fixed time $u \in [0,1)$, swapping the two pieces and subtracting $B(u)$ so that the result starts at zero gives the process $B\bigl((u + t) \bmod 1\bigr) - B(u)$, $t \in [0,1]$, which is again a standard Brownian bridge.

=== Path properties ===
The paths of a Brownian bridge are continuous and nowhere differentiable, and are Hölder continuous of every order less than $\tfrac12$ but not of order $\tfrac12$, as for Brownian motion, because on every interval $[0,s]$ with $s<1$ the law of the bridge is absolutely continuous with respect to that of Brownian motion, and the same holds near time 1 by time reversal. Over partitions of $[0,t]$ with mesh tending to zero, the sum of squared increments converges in probability to $t$, so the quadratic variation is the same as for Brownian motion.

== General Brownian bridges ==
=== Arbitrary interval and endpoints ===
A Brownian motion conditioned to pass through $a$ at time $t_1$ and through $b$ at time $t_2$ is, on $[t_1, t_2]$,
$$B_{a,b}(t) = a + \frac{t - t_1}{t_2 - t_1}\,(b - a) + \sqrt{t_2 - t_1}\;B\!\left(\frac{t - t_1}{t_2 - t_1}\right),$$
where $B$ is a standard Brownian bridge. Its mean is the straight line from $a$ at time $t_1$ to $b$ at time $t_2$, and its fluctuations around this line are those of a rescaled standard bridge. For $t_1 \le s \le t \le t_2$,
$$\operatorname{Var} B_{a,b}(t) = \frac{(t_2 - t)(t - t_1)}{t_2 - t_1}, \qquad \operatorname{Cov}\bigl(B_{a,b}(s), B_{a,b}(t)\bigr) = \frac{(s - t_1)(t_2 - t)}{t_2 - t_1}.$$

=== Multidimensional bridges ===
If $W$ is a standard Brownian motion in $\mathbb{R}^d$, then $W(t) - t\,W(1)$, taken componentwise, is a $d$-dimensional Brownian bridge from the origin to the origin; its components are independent standard Brownian bridges. A bridge from $x$ to $y$ in $\mathbb{R}^d$ adds the straight line from $x$ to $y$, as in one dimension.

== Constructions and representations ==
=== From Brownian motion ===
The path $W(t) - \lambda t W(1)$ for $\lambda$ increasing from 0 to 1: Brownian motion (red) at $\lambda = 0$, a Brownian bridge (blue) at $\lambda = 1$

Since $B(t) = W(t) - tW(1)$ is independent of $W(1)$, Brownian motion on $[0,1]$ decomposes into a bridge and an independent linear term. Conversely, if $B$ is a Brownian bridge and $Z$ is a standard normal variable independent of $B$, then $W(t) = B(t) + tZ$ is a standard Brownian motion on $[0,1]$. More generally, a Brownian motion on $[0, T]$ decomposes as $W(t) = \sqrt{T}\,B(t/T) + (t/\sqrt{T})\,Z$.

=== Conditioning and Doob h-transform ===
Let $0 < s < 1$. The law of $(B(t))_{0\le t\le s}$ is absolutely continuous with respect to the law of Brownian motion $(W(t))_{0\le t\le s}$, with density
$$\frac{1}{\sqrt{1-s}}\exp\!\left(-\frac{W(s)^2}{2(1-s)}\right),$$
which is the ratio $p_{1-s}(W(s),0)/p_1(0,0)$, where $p_u(x,y) = (2\pi u)^{-1/2}e^{-(y-x)^2/(2u)}$ is the transition density of Brownian motion. Equivalently, the bridge is the Doob h-transform of Brownian motion with the space-time harmonic function $h(t,x) = p_{1-t}(x,0)$, which produces the drift $\partial_x \log h(t,x) = -x/(1-t)$. On all of $[0,1]$ the two laws are mutually singular, because the bridge ends at 0 with probability one, whereas Brownian motion does so with probability zero.

=== Stochastic differential equation ===
On $[0, T)$, the Brownian bridge is the solution of the time-inhomogeneous stochastic differential equation
$$dB(t) = -\frac{B(t)}{T-t}\,dt + d\widetilde{W}(t), \qquad B(0) = 0, \quad 0 \le t < T,$$
for a standard Brownian motion $\widetilde{W}$ (a different process from the $W$ in $W(t) - (t/T)W(T)$). Its solution is
$$B(t) = (T-t)\int_0^t \frac{d\widetilde{W}(s)}{T-s}, \qquad 0 \le t < T,$$
which tends to 0 as $t \to T$. The coefficient $1/(T-t)$ of the drift grows without bound as $t \to T$, and the solution extends continuously to $B(T)=0$.

=== Karhunen–Loève expansion and Green's function ===
By the Karhunen–Loève theorem, the standard bridge has the series representation
$$B(t) = \sum_{k=1}^\infty Z_k\,\frac{\sqrt{2}\,\sin(k\pi t)}{k\pi},$$
where $Z_1, Z_2, \ldots$ are independent identically distributed standard normal variables. The functions $\sqrt2\sin(k\pi t)$ are the eigenfunctions of the covariance, regarded as an integral operator on functions on $[0,1]$, with eigenvalues $(k\pi)^{-2}$. On $[0, T]$ the terms become $\sqrt{2T}\sin(k\pi t/T)/(k\pi)$. The functions $\sqrt2\sin(k\pi t)$ are also the eigenfunctions of $-d^2/dt^2$ on $[0,1]$ with Dirichlet boundary conditions, with eigenvalues $(k\pi)^2$, the reciprocals of the covariance eigenvalues.

The covariance $\min(s,t) - st$ is the Green's function, that is, the integral kernel of the inverse, of the operator $-d^2/dt^2$ on $[0,1]$ with Dirichlet boundary conditions $f(0) = f(1) = 0$. For each fixed $t$ it is piecewise linear in $s$, vanishes at $s = 0$ and $s = 1$, matching the zero endpoint values of the bridge, and its slope drops by one at $s = t$. With the mixed conditions $f(0) = 0$, $f'(1) = 0$ instead, the Green's function is $\min(s,t)$, the covariance of Brownian motion.

=== Recursive midpoint construction ===
Recursive midpoint construction of a Brownian bridge: each new point (orange) is the average of its two nearest known neighbours, a distance $h$ apart, plus independent normal noise of variance $h/4$

A bridge can be simulated exactly by recursively sampling midpoints. Conditional on the values already placed, the value halfway between two of them that are $h$ apart is their average plus an independent normal innovation of mean zero and variance $h/4$. Starting from $B(0) = B(1) = 0$, repeating this step gives the bridge at all dyadic times $k/2^m$, and values already sampled are never changed. This is Lévy's construction of Brownian motion, except that the value at time 1 is fixed at 0 instead of being drawn from a normal distribution. Written as a series, it is the Lévy–Ciesielski expansion
$$B(t) = \sum_{n=0}^\infty \sum_{k=0}^{2^n-1} Z_{n,k}\, 2^{-n/2}\,\Lambda\!\left(2^n t - k\right),$$
where the $Z_{n,k}$ are independent standard normal variables and $\Lambda(u) = \min(u, 1-u)$ for $0\le u\le 1$ and 0 otherwise. The series converges uniformly on $[0,1]$ almost surely.

=== Time changes ===
The time change $t \mapsto t/(1-t)$, which maps $[0, 1)$ onto $[0, \infty)$, relates the bridge to Brownian motion:
$$B(t) = (1-t)\,W\!\left(\frac{t}{1-t}\right), \quad 0 \le t < 1,$$
$$W(t) = (1+t)\,B\!\left(\frac{t}{1+t}\right), \quad t \ge 0.$$
In the first identity $W$ is a standard Brownian motion; in the second $B$ is a standard bridge. The two transformations are inverse to each other.

=== Discrete approximations ===
Let $S_k = \xi_1 + \cdots + \xi_k$ be a random walk with independent, identically distributed steps $\xi_i$ of mean zero and variance one. Subtracting the linear endpoint term from the rescaled walk, as in $W(t) - tW(1)$, gives
$$\frac{1}{\sqrt{n}}\Bigl(S_{\lfloor nt\rfloor} - \frac{\lfloor nt\rfloor}{n}\,S_n\Bigr), \qquad 0 \le t \le 1,$$
which converges in distribution to a standard Brownian bridge, by Donsker's theorem and the continuous mapping theorem. This subtracts the endpoint term; it does not condition the walk on $S_n = 0$.

== Distributional properties ==
=== Maximum and absolute maximum ===
Let
$$M = \sup_{0 \le t \le 1} B(t), \qquad K = \sup_{0 \le t \le 1} |B(t)|.$$
Then
$$\Pr(M > x) = e^{-2x^2}, \qquad x \ge 0,$$
and, for $x>0$, $K$ follows the Kolmogorov distribution:
$$\Pr(K \le x) = 1 - 2\sum_{k=1}^\infty (-1)^{k-1} e^{-2k^2x^2} = \frac{\sqrt{2\pi}}{x}\sum_{k=1}^\infty e^{-(2k-1)^2\pi^2/(8x^2)}.$$
These are the limiting distributions of the one- and two-sided Kolmogorov–Smirnov statistics. The two-sided law is Kolmogorov's; numerical evaluation is discussed by Marsaglia, Tsang and Wang.

The first formula follows from the reflection principle applied to Brownian motion conditioned on $W(1)=0$. Equivalently, $2M^2$ has the standard exponential distribution, since $\Pr(2M^2 > y) = \Pr\bigl(M > \sqrt{y/2}\bigr) = e^{-y}$.

=== Time of the maximum and local time ===
The time at which the bridge attains its maximum is uniformly distributed on $[0,1]$. This follows from cyclic exchangeability: shifting the bridge cyclically by an independent uniform time preserves its law and shifts the time of the maximum by the same amount, modulo 1. For Brownian motion, by contrast, the time of the maximum follows the arcsine law.

The local time $L$ of the standard bridge at level 0, normalised as the density of the occupation measure,
$$L = \lim_{\varepsilon\downarrow 0} \frac{1}{2\varepsilon}\,\bigl|\{t\in[0,1] : |B(t)|<\varepsilon\}\bigr|,$$
has the Rayleigh distribution: $\Pr(L>\ell) = e^{-\ell^2/2}$ for $\ell \ge 0$, and so $\mathbb{E}L = \sqrt{\pi/2}$. Thus $L$ has the same distribution as $2M$, although the two are not equal path by path.

=== Time spent above zero ===
Fraction of time above zero for 5000 simulated paths: uniform for the Brownian bridge (top), arcsine law for Brownian motion (bottom). Each bridge is computed from the Brownian-motion path below it as $B(t) = W(t) - tW(1)$

The time that the bridge spends above zero,
$$A_+ = \int_0^1 \mathbf{1}\{B(t) > 0\}\,dt,$$
is uniformly distributed on $[0,1]$. The result is attributed to Lévy. For Brownian motion on $[0,1]$ the corresponding fraction instead follows the arcsine law, whose density is largest near 0 and 1.

=== Integral of the square ===
The integral of the squared bridge is equal in distribution to a series of squared normal variables,
$$\int_0^1 B(t)^2\,dt \;\overset{d}{=}\; \sum_{k=1}^\infty \frac{Z_k^2}{k^2\pi^2},$$
which follows from the Karhunen–Loève expansion. Its mean is $\tfrac16$ and its variance $\tfrac1{45}$. This is the limit of the Cramér–von Mises statistic, discussed later.

== Applications ==
=== Empirical processes and goodness-of-fit tests ===
The distribution of the scaled empirical process $\sqrt{n}\,(F_n(x) - x)$ for uniform samples approaches that of a Brownian bridge as $n$ grows

The empirical distribution function converges uniformly to the true distribution function, with a random error of order $1/\sqrt{n}$; magnified by $\sqrt{n}$, the error has a non-degenerate limit. Let $F_n$ be the empirical distribution function of $n$ independent observations, uniformly distributed on $[0,1]$, and let
$$\alpha_n(x) = \sqrt{n}\,\bigl(F_n(x) - x\bigr), \qquad 0 \le x \le 1,$$
be the empirical process. For every $n$, $\alpha_n$ has the covariance of the bridge, $\operatorname{Cov}\bigl(\alpha_n(s), \alpha_n(t)\bigr) = \min(s,t) - st$. As a random function, $\alpha_n$ converges in distribution to a standard Brownian bridge (formally, in the Skorokhod space of right-continuous functions with left limits, since the paths of $\alpha_n$ have jumps while those of the limit are continuous). This is Donsker's theorem for empirical processes, conjectured by Doob and proved by Donsker.

Without the factor $\sqrt{n}$, the error $\sup_x |F_n(x) - x|$ tends to zero almost surely (Glivenko–Cantelli theorem). For observations from a continuous distribution function $F$, the limit of $\sqrt{n}\,(F_n(x) - F(x))$ is $B(F(x))$; transforming the observations by $F$ (the probability integral transform) reduces this to the uniform case.

Histograms of $\sqrt{n}\,\sup_x |F_n(x) - x|$ over 10,000 samples, for $n = 16$, $100$ and $5000$, approach the Kolmogorov distribution (blue)

Goodness-of-fit statistics that are continuous functionals of this process therefore have limiting null distributions given by the same functionals of the bridge. The Kolmogorov–Smirnov statistic $\sqrt{n}\,\sup_x |F_n(x) - F(x)|$ converges to $K$, which has the Kolmogorov distribution given above. The Cramér–von Mises statistic $n\int (F_n - F)^2\,dF$ converges to $\int_0^1 B(t)^2\,dt$. The Anderson–Darling test weights the squared error by $1/\bigl(F(1-F)\bigr)$, so that its statistic converges to $\int_0^1 B(t)^2/\bigl(t(1-t)\bigr)\,dt$.

For two independent samples of sizes $n$ and $m$ from the same continuous distribution, the statistic $\sqrt{nm/(n+m)}\,\sup_x |F_n(x) - G_m(x)|$ also converges to $K$. If the parameters of $F$ are estimated from the same sample, the limiting process is generally modified and the usual Kolmogorov critical values need not apply; the Lilliefors test is the classical example, for the normal family with estimated mean and variance.

=== Simulation ===
The conditional distributions of the bridge are used to sample a Brownian path between times at which its values are already known, by the recursive midpoint rule or by the general bridge formula. In Monte Carlo simulation, this "Brownian bridge construction" is used in particular with quasi-Monte Carlo methods. It assigns the first input coordinates to the coarse, high-variance features of the path, which can reduce the effective dimension of some path-dependent integrands, as in option pricing.

For the bridge $B_{a,b}$ between the value $a$ at time $t_1$ and the value $b$ at time $t_2$, the maximum $M_{a,b}$ over $[t_1,t_2]$ satisfies
$$\Pr(M_{a,b} > c) = \exp\!\left(-\frac{2(c-a)(c-b)}{t_2-t_1}\right), \qquad c \ge \max(a,b),$$
which reduces to $e^{-2c^2}$ for the standard bridge. For a path simulated only at grid times, the formula gives the conditional probability that it crossed a barrier $c$ between two grid points; this is used in pricing barrier options. The formula can be inverted to sample the maximum exactly: for a bridge from 0 to $b$ on $[0,1]$, the maximum can be sampled as
$$M = \frac{b}{2} + \frac12\sqrt{b^2 - 2\ln U},$$
with $U$ uniform on $(0,1)$.

== Related processes ==
=== Brownian processes from random endpoints ===
Paths of a Brownian bridge plus a random line, for several covariance matrices of the endpoint values

As described above, Brownian motion on $[0,1]$ splits into a bridge and an independent random line: $W(t) = B(t) + tW(1)$, where $B(t) = W(t) - tW(1)$ is independent of the random slope $W(1)$. Conversely, adding the line $tZ$ with an independent standard normal $Z$ to a bridge gives Brownian motion back. Letting both ends of the line be random gives a larger family of continuous Gaussian processes on $[0,1]$. Let $(Y_0, Y_1)$ be a centred bivariate normal vector with covariance matrix $C$, independent of $B$; the line $(1-t)\,Y_0 + t\,Y_1$ runs from $Y_0$ at time 0 to $Y_1$ at time 1. Then
$$X(t) = B(t) + (1-t)\,Y_0 + t\,Y_1$$
has $X(0) = Y_0$, $X(1) = Y_1$, and covariance
$$\operatorname{Cov}\bigl(X(s), X(t)\bigr) = \min(s,t) - st + \begin{pmatrix}1-s & s\end{pmatrix} C \begin{pmatrix}1-t \\ t\end{pmatrix}.$$
The bridge is the case $C = 0$, and Brownian motion is the case $Y_0 = 0$, $Y_1$ standard normal described above, with covariance $\min(s,t)$. Exchanging the roles of the endpoints, $Y_0$ standard normal and $Y_1 = 0$, gives time-reversed Brownian motion $W(1-t)$, with covariance $1 - \max(s,t)$. If $Y_0$ and $Y_1$ are independent with variance $\tfrac12$, the covariance is $(1 - |s-t|)/2$, which depends only on $|s-t|$. This is the covariance of the stationary process $\bigl(W(t+1) - W(t)\bigr)/\sqrt{2}$, a scaled version of the Slepian process.

Every process obtained from a strictly positive self-adjoint boundary condition for the operator in the Green's function discussion above is of this form, and is determined by the covariance matrix $C$ of its endpoint values. Within this family, $X$ is Markov if and only if $\det C$ equals the off-diagonal entry of $C$, and it is stationary if and only if
$$C = \begin{pmatrix} v + 1/4 & v - 1/4 \\ v - 1/4 & v + 1/4 \end{pmatrix}, \qquad v \ge 0,$$
in which case the covariance is $v + 1/4 - |s-t|/2$. The case $v = 1/4$ is the scaled Slepian process, and $v = 0$, where $X(1) = -X(0)$, corresponds to the anti-periodic boundary condition.

=== Excursions and meanders ===
The standard Brownian excursion is Brownian motion on $[0,1]$ conditioned to stay positive on $(0,1)$ and to return to zero at time 1. It can be obtained from the bridge by a path transformation. Let $\theta$ be the almost surely unique time at which the bridge attains its minimum. The path
$$e(t) = B\bigl((\theta + t) \bmod 1\bigr) - B(\theta), \qquad 0\le t\le 1,$$
which moves the origin to the time of the minimum, wraps the path around and shifts it up so that it starts at zero, is a standard Brownian excursion. The time $\theta$ is uniformly distributed on $[0,1]$ and independent of the excursion, by the cyclic exchangeability of the bridge. This is Vervaat's transformation. It implies that the maximum of a standard excursion has the same law as the range $\max B - \min B$ of the bridge.

The Brownian meander is Brownian motion on $[0,1]$ conditioned to stay positive on $(0,1]$; unlike the excursion, its end value is free. Bertoin and Pitman independently found a path transformation from the bridge to the meander: the increments of the bridge before the time $\theta$ of its minimum are reversed in order, changed in sign and placed before the increments after $\theta$. The resulting path,
$$m(t) = \begin{cases} B(\theta - t) - B(\theta), & 0 \le t \le \theta, \\ B(t) - 2B(\theta), & \theta \le t \le 1, \end{cases}$$
is a standard Brownian meander, and the transformation is one-to-one, so the bridge can be recovered from the meander. In particular, the end value $m(1) = -2B(\theta)$ is twice the depth of the minimum of the bridge, and has the Rayleigh distribution.

=== Brownian continuum random tree ===
From a Brownian bridge to a random tree. Vervaat's transformation turns the bridge into a Brownian excursion. Sampled times define points of a finite subtree, with branch points determined by minima of the excursion between them. Increasing the number of sampled times reveals progressively more of the Brownian continuum random tree.

A standard Brownian excursion $e$, such as one obtained from a Brownian bridge by Vervaat's transformation, can be used to encode a random tree. For $s<t$, define
$$m_e(s,t)=\min_{s\le r\le t} e(r).$$
A time $t$ corresponds to a point of the tree at height $e(t)$ above the root, while $m_e(s,t)$ is the height at which the paths from the points corresponding to $s$ and $t$ meet. Thus the valleys of the excursion determine the branch points of the tree. For independent times $U_1,\ldots,U_n$ uniformly distributed on $[0,1]$, the corresponding points span a finite random subtree; with probability one the sampled points are leaves and the reduced tree is binary. When the leaves are ordered by their sampling times, its shape is uniformly distributed over the binary plane trees with $n$ leaves.

Using all times in $[0,1]$ gives the Brownian continuum random tree (also called the Brownian tree or Aldous tree) after identifying times at zero distance under
$$d_e(s,t)=e(s)+e(t)-2m_e(s,t).$$
This is the tree distance between the encoded points: their two heights minus twice the height of their common branch point. Times with $d_e(s,t)=0$ represent the same point. The resulting quotient space is a random real tree, and the subtree spanned by the root and finitely many independent uniform sample times has the finite-tree construction above. Under nested sampling, adding further times attaches new branches while leaving the existing metric subtree unchanged, so increasingly dense samples reveal progressively more of the continuum tree.

The Brownian continuum random tree is also the scaling limit of large critical random discrete trees. If a Galton–Watson tree whose offspring distribution has mean 1 and finite variance $\sigma^2$ is conditioned to have $n$ vertices, then rescaling graph distances by $\sigma/(2\sqrt n)$ yields convergence in distribution to the Brownian continuum random tree as $n\to\infty$.

=== Related bridge processes ===
More generally, a bridge of a stochastic process is the process conditioned to take a given value at the end of a time interval; the Brownian bridge is the case of Brownian motion. For suitable Markov processes the conditioning can be made rigorous by a space-time Doob h-transform, a method used for excursion bridges and for bridges of one-dimensional diffusions before it was made precise for general Markov processes. For Brownian motion with drift, $W_\mu(t) = W(t) + \mu t$, the drift drops out, since
$$W_\mu(t) - t\,W_\mu(1) = W(t) - t\,W(1),$$
and conditioning $W_\mu$ to end at 0 at time 1 gives the standard Brownian bridge for every $\mu$.

If $\mathbf{B}$ is a $d$-dimensional Brownian bridge from the origin to the origin, its Euclidean norm $|\mathbf{B}(t)|$ is a bridge of a Bessel process of dimension $d$, called a Bessel bridge, and
$$|\mathbf{B}(t)|^2 \sim t(1-t)\,\chi^2_d.$$
The three-dimensional Bessel bridge also gives representations of the Brownian excursion and the meander. If $B_1, B_2, B_3$ are independent standard Brownian bridges and $r \ge 0$, then
$$R_r(t) = \sqrt{\bigl(rt + B_1(t)\bigr)^2 + B_2(t)^2 + B_3(t)^2}, \qquad 0 \le t \le 1,$$
is a three-dimensional Bessel bridge from 0 to $r$, and has the law of the Brownian meander conditioned to end at $r$. For $r = 0$, $R_0$ has the law of the Brownian excursion $e$, and when $r$ is drawn independently from the Rayleigh distribution, $R_r$ has the law of the standard meander $m$. Three independent bridges therefore suffice to simulate meanders and excursions.

A simple random walk conditioned to return to the origin (a tied-down random walk) converges, after rescaling, to the Brownian bridge. Tied-down renewal processes, conditioned to have an event at both ends of the observation interval, generalise the tied-down random walk.
