= Brownian excursion =

Stochastic process

A realization of Brownian Excursion.

In probability theory a Brownian excursion process (BPE) is a stochastic process that is closely related to a Wiener process (or Brownian motion). Realisations of Brownian excursion processes are essentially just realizations of a Wiener process selected to satisfy certain conditions. In particular, a Brownian excursion process is a Wiener process conditioned to be positive and to take the value 0 at time 1. Alternatively, it is a Brownian bridge process conditioned to be positive. BEPs are important because, among other reasons, they naturally arise as the limit process of a number of conditional functional central limit theorems.

== Constructions ==
Brownian bridge as a union of excursions.

A Brownian excursion process, $e$, is a Wiener process (or Brownian motion) conditioned to be positive and to take the value 0 at time 1. Alternatively, it is a Brownian bridge process conditioned to be positive. Although note that, since the probability for an unrestricted Brownian bridge to be positive is zero, the conditioning requires care.

Another representation of a Brownian excursion $e$ in terms of a Brownian motion process W (due to Paul Lévy and noted by Kiyosi Itô and Henry P. McKean, Jr.) is in terms of the last time $\tau_{-}$ that W hits zero before time 1 and the first time $\tau_{+}$ that Brownian motion $W$ hits zero after time 1:

$$\{ e(t) : \ {0 \le t \le 1} \} \ \stackrel{d}{=} \ \left \{ \frac{|W((1-t) \tau_{-} + t \tau_{+} )|}{\sqrt{\tau_+ - \tau_{-}}} : \ 0 \le t \le 1 \right \},$$

where the square root is due to the square root self-similarity of Wiener process. That is, $\sqrt a W_{t/a}$ is a Wiener process for any fixed constant $a > 0$.

Vervaat's transformation.

Let $\tau_m$ be the time that a Brownian bridge process $W_0$ achieves its minimum on [0, 1]. Vervaat (1979) shows that

$$\{ e(t) : \ {0\le t \le 1} \} \ \stackrel{d}{=} \  \left \{ W_0 ( \tau_m + t \bmod 1) - W_0 (\tau_m ): \ 0 \le t \le 1 \right \} .$$

This is sometimes called Vervaat's transformation.

== Properties ==
Vervaat's representation of a Brownian excursion has several consequences for various functions of $e$. In particular:

$$M_{+} \equiv \sup_{0 \le t \le 1} e(t)  \ \stackrel{d}{=} \ \sup_{0 \le t \le 1} W_0 (t) - \inf_{0 \le t \le 1} W_0 (t) ,$$

(this can also be derived by explicit calculations) and

$$\int_0^1 e(t) \, dt \ \stackrel{d}{=} \
\int_0^1 W_0 (t) \, dt - \inf_{0 \le t \le 1} W_0 (t) .$$

The following result holds:

$$E M_+ = \sqrt{\pi/2} \approx 1.25331 \ldots, \,$$

and the following values for the second moment and variance can be calculated by the exact form of the distribution and density:

$$E M_+^2  \approx 1.64493 \ldots \ , \ \
\operatorname{Var}(M_+)  \approx 0.0741337 \ldots.$$

Groeneboom (1989), Lemma 4.2 gives an expression for the Laplace transform of (the density) of $\int_0^1 e(t) \, dt$. A formula for a certain double transform of the distribution of this area integral is given by Louchard (1984).

Groeneboom (1983) and Pitman (1983) give decompositions of Brownian motion $W$ in terms of i.i.d Brownian excursions and the least concave majorant (or greatest convex minorant) of $W$.

For an introduction to Itô's general theory of Brownian excursions and the Itô Poisson process of excursions, see Revuz and Yor (1994), chapter XII.

== Connections and applications ==
With probability 1, a Wiener process is continuous, which means the set on which it is non-zero is an open subset of the real line, thus it is the union of countably many Brownian excursions.

The Brownian excursion area

$$A_+ \equiv \int_0^1 e(t) \, dt$$

arises in connection with the enumeration of connected graphs, many other problems in combinatorial theory; see e.g. and the limit distribution of the Betti numbers of certain varieties in cohomology theory. Takacs (1991a) shows that $A_+$ has density

$$f_{A_+} (x) = \frac{2 \sqrt{6}}{x^2} \sum_{j=1}^\infty v_j^{2/3} e^{-v_j} U\left ( - \frac{5}{6} , \frac{4}{3}; v_j \right )   \ \ \text{ with }  \ \ v_j = \frac{2 |a_j|^3}{27x^2}$$

where $a_j$ are the zeros of the Airy function and $U$ is the confluent hypergeometric function. Janson and Louchard (2007) show that

$$f_{A_+} (x) \sim \frac{72 \sqrt{6}}{\sqrt{\pi}} x^2 e^{- 6 x^2}  \ \ \text{ as } \ \ x \rightarrow \infty,$$

and

$$P(A_+ > x) \sim \frac{6 \sqrt{6}}{\sqrt{\pi}} x e^{- 6x^2} \ \ \text{ as } \ \ x \rightarrow \infty.$$

They also give higher-order expansions in both cases.

Janson (2007) gives moments of $A_+$ and many other area functionals. In particular,

$$E (A_+) = \frac{1}{2} \sqrt{\frac{\pi}{2}},  \ \ E(A_+^2) = \frac{5}{12} \approx 0.416666 \ldots, \ \ \operatorname{Var}(A_+) = \frac{5}{12} - \frac{\pi}{8} \approx .0239675 \ldots \ .$$

Brownian excursions also arise in connection with queuing problems, railway traffic, and the heights of random rooted binary trees.

== Related processes ==
- Brownian bridge
- Brownian meander
- reflected Brownian motion
- skew Brownian motion
