= Erdős arcsine law =

Theorem on prime factors

In number theory, the Erdős arcsine law, named after Paul Erdős in 1969, states that the prime divisors of a number have a distribution related to the arcsine distribution.

Specifically, say that the j^{th} prime factor p of a given number n (in the sorted sequence of distinct prime factors) is "small" when log(log(p)) < j. Then, for any fixed parameter u, in the limit as x goes to infinity, the proportion of the integers n less than x that have fewer than u log(log(n)) small prime factors converges to

$$\frac{2}{\pi} \arcsin{ \sqrt{u} }.$$
