= Arcsine distribution =

Type of probability distribution

Arcsine
- Probability density function

- Cumulative distribution function
- Parameters: none
- Support: $x \in (0,1)$
- PDF: $f(x) = \frac{1}{\pi\sqrt{x(1-x)}}$
- CDF: $F(x) = \frac{2}{\pi}\arcsin\left(\sqrt x \right)$
- Quantile: $F^{-1}(x) = \sin\left(\frac{\pi x}{2}\right)^{2}$
- Mean: $\frac{1}{2}$
- Median: $\frac{1}{2}$
- Mode: $x \in \{0,1\}$
- Variance: $\tfrac{1}{8}$
- Skewness: $0$
- Excess kurtosis: $-\tfrac{3}{2}$
- Entropy: $\log \tfrac{\pi}{4}$
- MGF: $1 +\sum_{k=1}^{\infty} \left( \prod_{r=0}^{k-1} \frac{2r+1}{2r+2} \right) \frac{t^k}{k!}$
- CF: $e^{i\frac{t}{2}}J_0(\frac{t}{2})$

In probability theory, the arcsine distribution is the probability distribution whose cumulative distribution function involves the arcsine and the square root:

$$F(x) = \frac{2}{\pi}\arcsin\left(\sqrt x\right)=\frac{\arcsin(2x-1)}{\pi}+\frac{1}{2}$$

for 0 ≤ x ≤ 1, and whose probability density function is

$$f(x) = \frac{1}{\pi\sqrt{x(1-x)}}$$

on (0, 1). The standard arcsine distribution is a special case of the beta distribution with α = β = 1/2. That is, if $X$ is an arcsine-distributed random variable, then $X \sim {\rm Beta}\bigl(\tfrac{1}{2},\tfrac{1}{2}\bigr)$. By extension, the arcsine distribution is a special case of the Pearson type I distribution.

The arcsine distribution appears in the Lévy arcsine law, in the Erdős arcsine law, and as the Jeffreys prior for the probability of success of a Bernoulli trial. The arcsine probability density is a distribution that appears in several random-walk fundamental theorems. In a fair coin toss random walk, the probability for the time of the last visit to the origin is distributed as an (U-shaped) arcsine distribution. In a two-player fair-coin-toss game, a player is said to be in the lead if the random walk (that started at the origin) is above the origin. The most probable number of times that a given player will be in the lead, in a game of length 2N, is not N. On the contrary, N is the least likely number of times that the player will be in the lead. The most likely number of times in the lead is 0 or 2N (following the arcsine distribution).

== Generalization ==
Arcsine – bounded support
- Parameters: $-\infty < a < b < \infty \,$
- Support: $x \in (a,b)$
- PDF: $f(x) = \frac{1}{\pi\sqrt{(x-a)(b-x)}}$
- CDF: $F(x) = \frac{2}{\pi}\arcsin\left(\sqrt \frac{x-a}{b-a} \right)$
- Quantile: $F^{-1}(x) = \left(b-a\right)\sin\left(\frac{\pi x}{2}\right)^{2}+a$
- Mean: $\frac{a+b}{2}$
- Median: $\frac{a+b}{2}$
- Mode: $x \in {a,b}$
- Variance: $\tfrac{1}{8}(b-a)^2$
- Skewness: $0$
- Excess kurtosis: $-\tfrac{3}{2}$
- Entropy: $\log\left(\pi\frac{b-a}{4}\right)$
- CF: $e^{it\frac{b+a}{2}}J_0(\frac{b-a}{2}t)$

=== Arbitrary bounded support ===
The distribution can be expanded to include any bounded support from a ≤ x ≤ b by a simple transformation

$$F(x) = \frac{2}{\pi}\arcsin\left(\sqrt \frac{x-a}{b-a} \right)$$

for a ≤ x ≤ b, and whose probability density function is

$$f(x) = \frac{1}{\pi\sqrt{(x-a)(b-x)}}$$

on (a, b).

=== Shape factor ===
The generalized standard arcsine distribution on (0,1) with probability density function

$$f(x;\alpha) = \frac{\sin \pi\alpha}{\pi}x^{-\alpha}(1-x)^{\alpha-1}$$

is also a special case of the beta distribution with parameters ${\rm Beta}(1-\alpha,\alpha)$.

Note that when $\alpha = \tfrac{1}{2}$ the general arcsine distribution reduces to the standard distribution listed above.

== Properties ==
- Arcsine distribution is closed under translation and scaling by a positive factor
  - If $X \sim {\rm Arcsine}(a,b) \ \text{then } kX+c \sim {\rm Arcsine}(ak+c,bk+c)$
- The square of an arcsine distribution over (-1, 1) has arcsine distribution over (0, 1)
  - If $X \sim {\rm Arcsine}(-1,1) \ \text{then } X^2 \sim {\rm Arcsine}(0,1)$
- The coordinates of points uniformly selected on a circle of radius $r$ centered at the origin (0, 0), have an ${\rm Arcsine}(-r,r)$ distribution
  - For example, if we select a point uniformly on the circumference, $U \sim {\rm Uniform}(0,2\pi )$, we have that the point's x coordinate distribution is $r \cdot \cos(U) \sim {\rm Arcsine}(-r,r)$, and its y coordinate distribution is $r \cdot \sin(U) \sim {\rm Arcsine}(-r,r)$

== Characteristic function ==
The characteristic function of the generalized arcsine distribution is a zero order Bessel function of the first kind, multiplied by a complex exponential, given by $e^{it\frac{b+a}{2}}J_0(\frac{b-a}{2}t)$. For the special case of $b = -a$, the characteristic function takes the form of $J_0(b t)$.

== Related distributions ==
- If U and V are i.i.d uniform (−π,π) random variables, then $\sin(U)$, $\sin(2U)$, $-\cos(2U)$, $\sin(U+V)$ and $\sin(U-V)$ all have an ${\rm Arcsine}(-1,1)$ distribution.
- If $X$ is the generalized arcsine distribution with shape parameter $\alpha$ supported on the finite interval [a,b] then $\frac{X-a}{b-a} \sim {\rm Beta}(1-\alpha,\alpha) \$
- If X ~ Cauchy(0, 1) then $\tfrac{1}{1+X^2}$ has a standard arcsine distribution
