= Arcsine laws (Wiener process) =

Collection of results for one-dimensional random walks and Brownian motion

In probability theory, the arcsine laws are a collection of results for one-dimensional random walks and Brownian motion (the Wiener process). The best known of these is attributed to Paul Lévy (1939).

All three laws relate path properties of the Wiener process to the arcsine distribution. A random variable X on [0,1] is arcsine-distributed if

$$\Pr \left[ X \leq x \right] = \frac{2}{\pi} \arcsin\left(\sqrt{x}\right), \qquad \forall x \in [0,1].$$

== Statement of the laws ==
Throughout we suppose that (W_{t})_{0 ≤ t ≤ 1} ∈ R is the one-dimensional Wiener process on [0,1]. Scale invariance ensures that the results can be generalised to Wiener processes run for t ∈[0,∞).

=== First (Lévy's) arcsine law ===
Fraction of time above zero for 5000 simulated paths: arcsine law for Brownian motion W (bottom), uniform for the Brownian bridge B(t) = W(t) − tW(1) computed from the same paths (top).

The first arcsine law states that the proportion of time that the one-dimensional Wiener process is positive follows an arcsine distribution. Let

$$T_+ = \left| \{\, t \in [0,1] \, \colon \, W_t > 0 \,\}\right|$$

be the measure of the set of times in [0,1] at which the Wiener process is positive. Then $T_+$ is arcsine distributed.

=== Second arcsine law ===
The second arcsine law describes the distribution of the last time the Wiener process changes sign. Let

$$L=\sup\left\{t \in [0,1] \, \colon \, W_t = 0 \right\}$$

be the time of the last zero. Then L is arcsine distributed.

=== Third arcsine law ===
The third arcsine law states that the time at which a Wiener process achieves its maximum is arcsine distributed.

The statement of the law relies on the fact that the Wiener process has an almost surely unique maxima, and so we can define the random variable M which is the time at which the maxima is achieved. i.e. the unique M such that

$$W_M = \sup \{ W_s \, \colon \, s \in [0,1] \}.$$

Then M is arcsine distributed. For a Brownian bridge, by contrast, the time of the maximum is uniformly distributed on $[0,1]$.

== Equivalence of the second and third laws ==
Defining the running maximum process M_{t} of the Wiener process

$$M_t = \sup \{ W_s \, \colon \, s \in [0,t] \},$$

then the law of X_{t} = M_{t} − W_{t} has the same law as a reflected Wiener process |B_{t}| (where B_{t} is a Wiener process independent of W_{t}).

Since the zeros of B and |B| coincide, the last zero of X has the same distribution as L, the last zero of the Wiener process. The last zero of X occurs exactly when W achieves its maximum. It follows that the second and third laws are equivalent.
