= Oregon State University College of Science =

College within Oregon State University

Coordinates: 44.56°N 123.28°W

- Type: Public
- Established: 1932
- Parent institution: Oregon State University
- Dean: Eleanor Feingold
- Undergraduates: 3,400
- Location: Corvallis, Oregon, US
- Colors: Orange and black
- Website: science.oregonstate.edu

Oregon State University's College of Science is a public academic institution operating as a member of Oregon State University, a public research university. The college of science consists of seven schools, offering nine undergraduate programs and supporting seven doctoral-granting programs and eight master's degree-granting programs. The college also supports the science discipline colleges and bachelor of science students by offering key undergraduate science courses required by their own curriculums. The college of science claims more than 3,400 students and a faculty of 184. Sixteen faculty members are elected American Association for the Advancement of Science (AAAS) fellows.

Since its inception, the college has received more than $55 million in grant funding, developed more than 48 new technologies, and has been awarded 18 US patents since 2011.

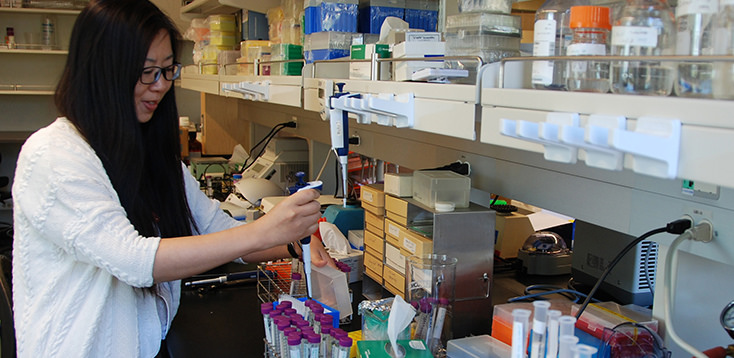
An OSU biology student researches disease-fighting molecules known as morpholinos

== History ==
The college was founded in 1932 as the Oregon State University School of Science. The creation of the college came as a result of a statewide reorganization of the Oregon State System of Higher Education in the same year. OSU paleontologist Earl L. Packard became the first dean that year. However, science coursework dates back much earlier to when the university first offered college-level courses. OSU's first college-level science classes were offered in 1868 and provided instruction in general science, chemistry, and the geology of Oregon. In 1935 OSU awarded its first doctorates. Three of the four Ph.D. recipients were college of science students. Herbert L. Jones received his Ph.D. in physics, Alfred Taylor in zoology, and Karl Klemm in chemistry.

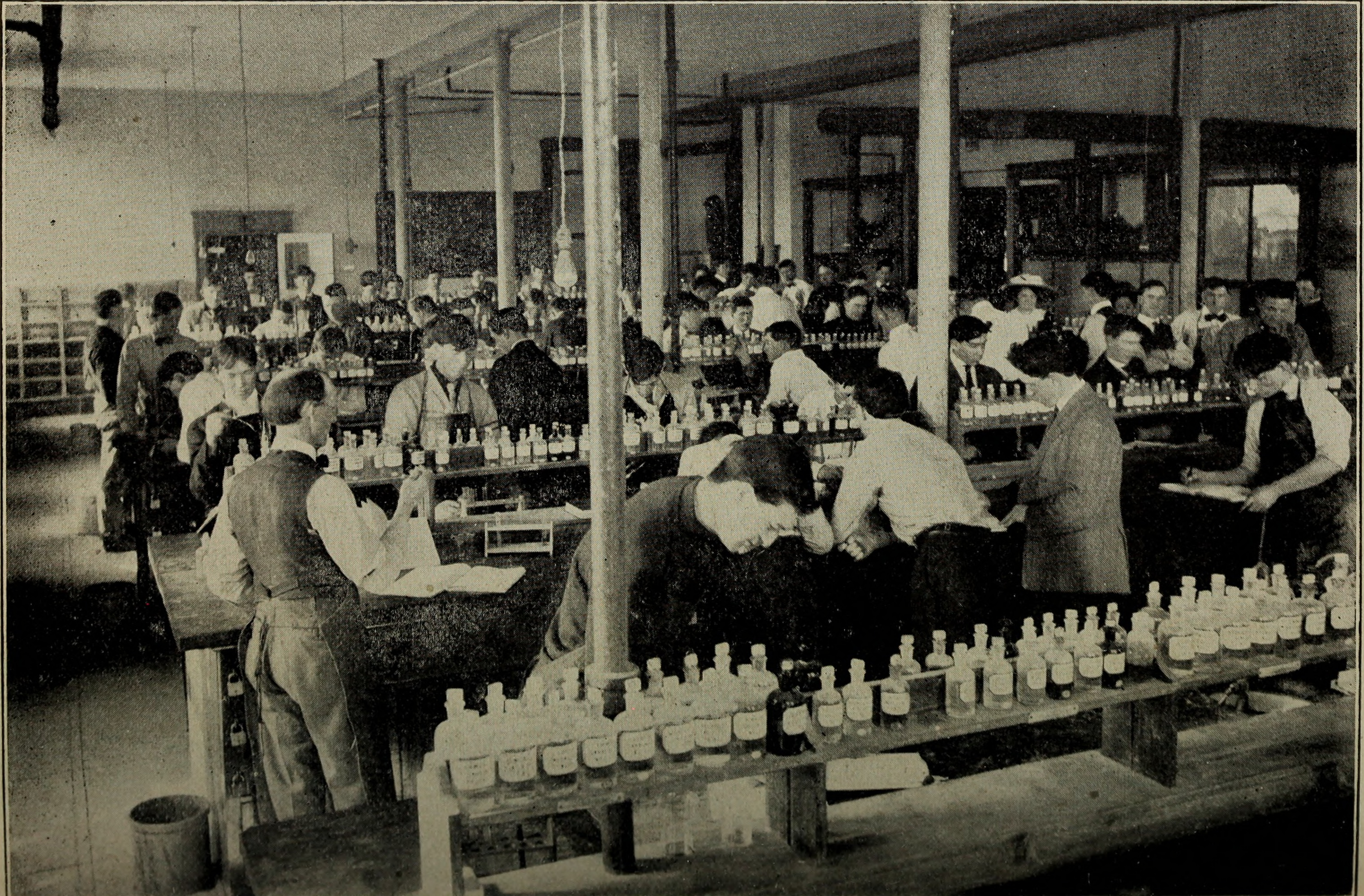
Early chemistry lab at OSU. Known as the "Chem Shack" (1904).

The first woman to receive a Ph.D. from OSU was Chung Kwai Lui. She received her doctorate from OSU in physics in 1941. An immigrant from China, Lui was later recruited into the top-secret Manhattan Project to help develop the first atomic bomb. During World War II, her expertise in purifying microscopic quantities of uranium was sought out by leaders at the Manhattan Project to purify larger, kilogram quantities. Her legacy lives on at OSU through the Wei Family Foundation Scholarships.

The school was later renamed to the Oregon State University College of Science in 1974.

== Departments ==
- Biochemistry and Biophysics
- Integrative Biology
- Chemistry
- Mathematics
- Microbiology
- Physics
- Statistics

== Medical science programs (pre-med) ==
The college of science is closely aligned with top medical schools throughout the nation. On average, 60-to-70 percent of graduate applicants are accepted by their medical school of choice. This is an exceptionally high acceptance rate when compared to the 33-to-40 percent national average. Top majors at OSU for the pre-med program include: biochemistry and biophysics, biochemistry and molecular biology, biohealth sciences (Ecampus), biology, chemistry and microbiology. A range of special programs in health-related fields are also offered through the college. The variety in curriculum is geared to help students meet entrance requirements for medical schools in most major medical fields, including more specific medical programs in clinical laboratory science, dentistry, optometry, pharmacy, physical therapy, physician assistant, podiatry and veterinary medicine.

== Budget cuts ==
In 1990, Oregon voters passed the historic property-tax reducing Ballot Measure 5. Passage of the new law dramatically changed Oregon’s property taxes, greatly reduced funding for many K-12 schools, and helped to eliminate a popular program at the Oregon State University College of Science. Following passage of the measure, the college of science was asked by university administrators to find one program to close to help meet the projected budget cuts. Reluctantly, college administrators chose to eliminate the general science department in 1991 and 1992 due to the department's broad curriculum. The university's general fund appropriations fell from $117 million in fiscal 1992/93 to $101.2 million for the 1993/94 fiscal year.

General science classes are still offered through the college curriculum, but only as a series of optional courses or discipline electives.

== Notable alumni ==
- Stacy Allison, first American woman to reach the summit of Mount Everest
- Clinton Ballou, acclaimed Berkley professor and researcher of metabolism of carbohydrates and the structures of microbial cell walls.
- Frits Bolkestein, retired Dutch politician and businessman who served as leader of the People's Party for Freedom and Democracy (VVD) from 1990 to 1998 and European Commissioner for Internal Market from 1999 until 2004.
- Knute Buehler, former Oregon state representative 2015-19, 2018 Republican gubernatorial candidate, orthopedic surgeon, OSU Rhodes Scholar.
- Peggy Cherng, co-founder and co-CEO of Panda Express, America's second richest self-made woman born outside the United States.
- Charity Dean, epidemiologist, assistant director of the California Department of Public Health in 2020 during the COVID-19 pandemic in the United States, co-founder and CEO of The Public Health Company.
- Philip Emeagwali, internationally acclaimed computer scientist and 1989 Gordon Bell Prize for price-performance in high-performance computing applications.
- John Ensign, former politician who served as a United States senator from Nevada.
- Michael Gribskov, served as president of the International Society for Computational Biology, professor of biological sciences and computer science at Purdue University.
- Marcia Gumpertz, acclaimed American statistician known for her research on agricultural statistics, spatial analysis, the design of experiments, and plant disease epidemiology.
- Bobby Henderson, nationally recognized academic activist, physicist, author of The Gospel of the Flying Spaghetti Monster.
- Wayne L. Hubbell, researcher in lens structure and function relationships in water-soluble proteins, Jules Stein Professor of Ophthalmology at UCLA.
- Abdul Jerri, Iraqi American mathematician, most recognized for his contributions to Shannon Sampling Theory, Its Generalizations, Error Analysis, and Historical Reviews
- Donald Kerr, wildlife biologist, founder of High Desert Museum.
- Ann Kiessling, American biochemist and biophysicist, pioneer and discoverer of reverse transcriptase activity in normal human cells.
- Douglas McKay, American politician, 35th United States Secretary of the Interior, 25th governor of Oregon, and Oregon state senator.
- Beau Mirchoff, Canadian-American actor best known for his role in the MTV series Awkward, his role as Jamie Hunter in Good Trouble, and his role in Now Apocalypse on Starz.
- Forrest Preston, owner, founder and CEO of Life Care Centers of America.
- Katharine Jefferts Schori, Presiding Bishop of the Episcopal Church.
- Leonard Shoen, founder of the U-Haul truck and trailer organization.
- Andrew E. Smith, OSU graduate researcher credited with discovering the popular color Mas Blue in 2009.
- Ann Streissguth, academic and medical researcher known for her work on fetal alcohol syndrome.
- Warren M. Washington, former chair of the National Science Board, current senior scientist at the National Center for Atmospheric Research (NCAR).
- Marta Torres, OSU professor and former student, known for biogeochemical impact research on the deep biosphere (ocean floor).
- Willi Unsoeld, member of the first American expedition to summit Mount Everest, known as the "Father of Experiential Education" and a leader in the outdoor education movement, co-founder of campus's mountaineering club, physics.
- Michael Waterman, co-inventor of the Smith-Waterman algorithm used in DNA sequence alignment. Holds an Endowed Associates Chair in Biological Sciences, Mathematics and Computer Science at the University of Southern California. One of the foundational and lead figures in the field of computational biology.

== Notable faculty ==
- Tevian Dray, research includes applications of the octonins to the theory of fundamental particles, co-author of The Geometry of the Octonions (2015), elected a fellow of the American Physical Society (2010).
- Douglas Keszler, research helped thin-film electroluminescent devices, which display high definition monochromic color outputs, display a full range of color, a distinguished professor in the department of chemistry.
- Jane Lubchenco, U.S. deputy director for climate and environment, university distinguished professor.
- Corinne Alison Manogue, acclaimed physics educator/researcher, revealed a physically important electromagnetic sign error, relating to the Casimir effect, now covered in standard textbooks.
- George Poinar Jr., acclaimed entomologist, co-discovered DNA extraction method used for fossils embedded in amber.
- Heidi Schellman, considered an expert in the field of quantum chromodynamics, ranked as one of the top female scientists in the world by the ranking group research.com.
- Mas Subramanian, recognized for his work in structure-property relationships of inorganic compounds, including several breakthrough discoveries of novel functional materials, elected fellow of the Neutron Scattering Society of America (2024), OSU solid-state materials scientist and chemistry professor.
- Janet Tate, her research and discoveries in the Gravity Probe B experiment have led to a subsequent interest by science in gravitoelectromagnetism.

== Deans ==
1. Earl L. Packard (1932–1938)
2. Francois A. Gilfillan (1938–1962)
3. Vernon Cheldelin (1962–1965)
4. John Ward (1966–1970)
5. Robert W. Krauss (1973–1980)
6. Thomas Sugihara (1981–1986)
7. Frederick M. Horne (1986–1999)
8. Sherman H. Bloomer (1999–2013)
9. Vincent T. Remcho (2013–2014)
10. Sastry Pantula (2014–2017)
11. Roy Haggerty (2017–2022)
12. Vrushali Bokil, interim, (2022–2023)
13. Eleanor Feingold (2023-present)
