= John U. Monro =

American academic administrator

John Usher Monro
- Monro as assistant provost and counselor for veterans in 1949

Dean of Harvard College
- In office 1958 – 1967
- Preceded by: Delmar Leighton
- Succeeded by: Fred Glimp

Personal details
- Born: December 23, 1912 North Andover, Massachusetts, U.S.
- Died: March 29, 2002 (aged 89) La Verne, California, U.S.
- Spouse: Dorothy Steven Foster (m. 1936; died 1984)
- Children: 2
- Education: Phillips Academy
- Alma mater: Harvard College
- Awards: Bronze Star Medal (1945); Doctor of Humane Letters (1967)

Military service
- Allegiance: United States
- Branch: United States Navy
- Rank: Damage control officer
- War: World War II

John Usher Monro (December 23, 1912 – March 29, 2002) was an American academic administrator and Dean of Harvard College from 1958 to 1967. He made national headlines when he left Harvard for Miles College, a historically black and then-unaccredited institution in Birmingham, Alabama.

Monro, born in Massachusetts and educated at Phillips Academy in Andover, worked as a journalist after graduating from Harvard University in 1935. When the United States entered World War II in 1941, he joined the United States Navy and later served on the USS Enterprise. He was honoured with a Bronze Star for his efforts as a damage control officer. After the war, he worked in various roles at Harvard, became the director of financial aid and co-founded the College Scholarship Service. He was made Dean of Harvard College in 1958, but his strong interest in supporting black students saw him leave Harvard to work as director of freshman studies at Miles College in 1967. In the late 1970s, he moved on to Tougaloo College, where he worked as the director of its writing center.

== Early life and education ==
Monro was born in North Andover, Massachusetts, to Claxton and Frances Sutton Monro on December 23, 1912. His father was a Harvard-educated chemist working at the American Woolen Company and his mother was the daughter of a mill owner. As his family was not well-off, he attended Phillips Academy at Andover on a scholarship and was later admitted to Harvard College, also on a scholarship. He was aware of social and racial issues, interested in Karl Marx but refused to join the Communist Party, saying that whenever one disagreed with the communists, "they'd try to bulldoze you". Nonetheless, he believed in historical materialism, but said that he "could profit from knowing that without joining the party".

He was heavily involved in journalism at Harvard, serving as an editor for The Harvard Crimson in 1934. However, he found it too socially conservative and set up a rival daily, the Harvard Journal, which ran for almost six weeks. It was more inclusive than the all-male Crimson, as it covered the entire university and had a section on Radcliffe College with its own editorial board. Due to the time spent on editing the new newspaper, he did not finish his senior thesis on time and graduated in 1935, a year late. He was interested in Scottish history because of familial ties to Scotland—he had relatives living in Foulis Castle—and wrote his senior thesis on eighteenth-century Scottish history.

He then worked as Harvard correspondent for the Boston Evening Transcript and writer for the Harvard news office until the United States entered World War II in 1941.

== War service and career at Harvard ==
Initially enlisting for the public relations department of the Navy, Monro later became a damage control officer on the USS Enterprise. His position put him in charge of machinists and sailors repairing the ship in the event of an attack. He was awarded a Bronze Star for his "organizational leadership" during a kamikaze attack on the carrier near Okinawa in 1945. According to Archie Epps, Monro's dedication to racial integration began when he was tasked by his captain to integrate his ship.

Originally intending to continue his career as a journalist after the war, he was convinced to work at Harvard’s Office of Veterans Affairs. He became director of financial aid in 1950. Disagreeing with Harvard's approach to use financial aid as a means to compete for the best applicants, he devised a formula to calculate applicants' actual need for aid instead. A simplified version called the "Monro Doctrine" (Note: Not to be confused with the Monroe Doctrine) is still used today. He also helped set up the College Scholarship Service in the 1950s and was its first chairman. Harvard Student Agencies was also created by Monro in 1958.

He became Dean of Harvard College in 1958 and was awarded an L.H.D. in 1967. He took a hard line against drug use, promising to expel anyone involved in their distribution or use.

Monro was strongly involved in advocacy for black students. In 1948, he started traveling to recruit promising black undergraduates, joined the board of the National Scholarship Service and Fund for Negro Students and supported the creation of the Association of African and Afro-American Students in 1963. In a 1960 educational conference, he expressed dismay over college admissions, as they were "starving the development of [...] children, whose only fault is that they are poor or a wrong color". Believing that the under-representation of black employees in large companies was a result of inadequate education, Monro called for black colleges to provide more practical instruction, such as in business administration, to their students.

== Miles and Tougaloo College ==
External audio
- Monro talking about "Student Power" at the University of Alabama's Student Government Association in 1968 (Monro starts speaking at 2:27)

Monro met Lucius Pitts, president of Miles College, at the annual meeting of the American Teachers Association in 1962. Pitts invited Monro to speak to the Miles faculty the following year. His talk on September 4, 1963, coincided with the bombing of Arthur Shores's home, which set off a major riot. Despite being visibly shaken by the unrest, Monro was interested to return and asked to assist in Miles College basic-skills workshop the following summer.

Pitts and Monro also organized a partnership which teamed members of Phillips Brooks House, a non-profit organization at Harvard University, with Miles students to tutor grade-schoolers in Birmingham, Alabama. After having taught English at Miles College for three consecutive summers for free, he resigned as Dean of Harvard College in 1967 to become director of freshman studies at Miles College. Aware of the impression leaving one of the most prestigious positions in American education for a lowly paid role at an unaccredited college gave, Monro said: "I want to disassociate myself from any idea that this is a sacrifice. I see it as a job of enormous reward".

Monro convinced a number of graduate students and teachers to move to the South with him, while arguing that black colleges needed black leadership to achieve their aims as bastions of black institutional strength. He taught more classes than many of his former colleagues at Harvard and devised a new English and social studies curriculum. Robert J. Donovan, spending some time with Monro for the San Francisco Examiner in 1972, described him as "resoundingly happy" at Miles College. Monro found the atmosphere at Miles to be different from selective schools of the Northeast, as its students, often dividing their time between work and class, believed that college could do something for them and were serious in their studies.

He left Miles for Tougaloo College, also a historically black and financially deprived college, a decade later. He taught English and served as the director of its writing center. Voted best teacher at Tougaloo College at the age of 80, he retired at the age of 84 due to Alzheimer's disease. He died on March 29, 2002, in La Verne, California, of pneumonia.

== Legacy ==
The Harvard Foundation for Intercultural and Race Relations, which awarded Monro the Harvard Foundation Humanitarian Award in 1993, commissioned a portrait of him for their Minority Portraiture Project. It was painted by Stephen E. Coit and unveiled in Phillips Brooks House on October 13, 2008. It was hung next to a room named after Monro. At the unveiling, S. Allen Counter, the foundation's executive director, said: "To give up a powerful career at Harvard to go and work at a minority school is just amazing". A second portrait hangs in the Writing Center at Tougaloo College. It was painted by Johnnie M. Maberry Gilbert, who graduated from Tougaloo in 1970.

== Personal life ==
Monro married Dorothy Steven Foster (d. 1984), whom he had known since his childhood in Andover, Massachusetts, in 1936. They had two daughters, Ann Monro and Janet Dreyer.

Claxton Monro (May 7, 1914 – September 20, 1991), one of John Monro's brothers, also attended Phillips Academy and graduated with a degree in engineering and business administration from the Massachusetts Institute of Technology in 1936. After working for a couple of years for the Guaranty Trust Company and J. Walter Thompson, he attended the General Theological Seminary, graduating in 1943. He served as assistant to Sam Shoemaker at Calvary Church in Manhattan from 1942 to 1945, when he was made rector of Grace Episcopal Church. St. Stephen's Episcopal Church in Houston, Texas, appointed him rector in 1950. Monro retired in 1981, the first rector of St. Stephen's to do so.

His youngest brother Sutton Monro (November 15, 1919 – March 5, 1995) graduated from the Massachusetts Institute of Technology in 1942. He went on to work for Bell Labs as a quality control engineer and taught mathematics at the University of Maine at Orono. He attended the University of North Carolina, Chapel Hill, to pursue a Ph.D in statistics under the supervision of Herbert Robbins, with whom he developed the Robbins–Monro algorithm. A rule at the university prevented students who pre-published doctoral work from being awarded their degree, but his advisor published the work before Monro finished his Ph.D, meaning that he never received his Ph.D. (Note: According to Robbins in a 1988 interview, Monro left his Ph.D. as he became upset with Robbins communicating their problem to Kiefer and Wolfowitz, leading to them getting results before Monro did.) Monro was then employed by New York City, until he was hired as associate professor of industrial engineering by Lehigh University. He was a Navy veteran of World War II and the Korean War. He had two sons and two stepsons.

== Publications ==
=== Journal articles ===
- "Black Studies, White Teachers, and Black Colleges". Teaching Forum. 3 (3). April 1970. OCLC 1061441341.
- "The Black College Dilemma". Educational Record. 53 (2). Spring 1972. OCLC 425490667.
- Monro, John U. (1975). "The college as agent for social change". New Directions for Higher Education. 1975 (9): 51–63. doi:10.1002/he.36919750906. ISSN 0271-0560.
- Monro, John U. (1994). "Helping the Student Help Himself". Journal of Student Financial Aid. 24 (2): 9–16. doi:10.55504/0884-9153.1126.

=== Other publications ===
- Better and more responsible access to higher education. Technology and Culture Seminar, Massachusetts Institute of Technology. 1973. OCLC 42423629.
- The open door : testing and instruction. Atlanta, Georgia: Southern Education Foundation. 1977. OCLC 10386250.
