= Alabau =

Alabau is a surname. Notable people with the surname include:

- Fatiha Alabau (born 1961), French mathematician
- Magaly Alabau (born 1945), Cuban-American poet, theater director, and actor
- Marina Alabau (born 1985), Spanish sailor
