= SDCA =

SDCA can refer to:

- San Diego
- Stochastic dual coordinate ascent, a mathematical optimisation algorithm.
- St. Dominic College of Asia, a college in the Philippines.
- the Small Drum Corps Association.
