= Robin W. Kilson =

American professor of history

- Born: May 31, 1953; Newton, Massachusetts
- Died: April 29, 2009 (aged 55); Cambridge, Massachusetts
- Occupations: educator, author

Robin W. Kilson (1953–2009) was a professor of history. She was known for co-sponsoring the 1994 conference Black Women in the Academy: Defending Our Name 1894-1994 at Massachusetts Institute of Technology.

== Biography ==
Kilson was born on May 31, 1953, in Newton, Massachusetts. She obtained her Bachelor of Arts, Master's, and PhD from Harvard University. She taught at Bryn Mawr College, the Massachusetts Institute of Technology (MIT), Mount Holyoke College, the University of Texas at Austin, and Northeastern University. In 1993 Kilson was a fellow at the Bunting Institute at Radcliffe College.

In 1994 Kilson and Evelynn M. Hammonds organized a conference for January 13 through 15 at MIT called Black Women in the Academy: Defending Our Name 1894-1994. The conference explored the experiences of black women professors. Speakers included Vinie Burrows, Johnnetta Cole, Angela Davis, and Lani Guinier. More than 2,000 people attended. In 1999 Kilson co-edited, with Robert D. King, the book Statecraft of British Imperialism: Essays in Honour of Wm. Roger Louis (ISBN 0714643785).

Kilson died on April 29, 2009, in Cambridge, Massachusetts.

== Personal ==
Kilson was married to Burr Tweedy.
