= Katehakis =

Katehakis is a surname. Notable people with the surname include:

- Michael Katehakis (born 1952), American academic
