= Nancy Zhang =

Nancy Zhang may refer to:

- Nancy R. Zhang, American statistician
- Zhang Zetian (born 1993), Chinese businesswoman
