= SVRG =

SVRG can refer to:

- Silicon Valley Roller Girls, a roller derby league from San Jose, California
- Stuttgart Valley Rollergirlz, a roller derby league from Stuttgart in Germany
- Stochastic Variance Reduced Gradient, an optimization method
