= Stephen E. Coit =

American painter

Stephen Ellsworth Coit (born April 18, 1948 in Beverly, Massachusetts) is an American entrepreneur, venture capitalist, and painter, best known for his series of portraits commissioned by Harvard University.

Coit graduated from Kent School in Kent, Connecticut in 1967 and Harvard College in 1971. He received an MBA degree from the Harvard Business School in 1977. He began his career as a senior programmer at Searle Medidate, a division of G.D. Searle. Coit then worked as a product manager for Hewlett-Packard Corporation. Subsequently, he joined Prime Computer as European marketing manager, and was then recruited by the founding team of Raster Technologies to be its first vice president of marketing. From 1984 to 1994, he was a general partner of Merrill, Pickard, Anderson & Eyre, a venture capital firm.

Coit was a director of Aspect Medical Systems, Inc., from 1987 to 2003. From 1995 to 1997, Coit was a general partner of Charles River Ventures, a venture capital firm. From 1989, he was a director of International Data Group, a provider of media research and conferences to the information technology industry. From 1997 he has been self-employed as an artist full-time. Coit relates that, while he always liked to draw, it was only after a friend gave him a box of pastels in 1992, while he was ill for some months, that he considered art as a career.

Coit was appointed in 2002 as the Harvard Foundation's portraiture project artist and has painted portraits of individuals with distinguished service to Harvard, mainly people of color. His portraits under this commission include Dean of Students Archie Epps, professor of music and East Asian languages and civilization Rulan Chao Pian, senior admissions officer David L. Evans, musicologist Eileen Jackson Southern, anthropologist Stanley Tambiah, administrator Kiyo Morimoto, Dean of the College Fred Jewett, Dean of Harvard College John Monro, medical school professor Harold Amos, 17th century native American alumnus Caleb Cheeshahteaumuck, psychiatrist Chester Pierce, professor of government Martin Kilson, and Bunting Institute professor Florence Ladd. Coit's portrait of Harvard preacher Peter J. Gomes hangs in Harvard's Signet Society

In addition to his Harvard commissions, Coit has executed portraits for Lesley University (of president emerita Margaret McKenna) and Tufts University (of president Lawrence S. Bacow).

Coit is a trustee of the Boston Museum of Science. In the late 1990s, he was a trustee of the Computer Museum in Boston.
