= Josée Dupuis =

Canadian biostatistician

Josée Dupuis is a Canadian biostatistician and professor at McGill University, where she is the Strathcona Chair in Epidemiology and chair of the Department of Epidemiology, Biostatistics and Occupational Health in the School of Population and Global Health. She previously spent nearly 20 years at the Boston University School of Public Health, where she served as chair of the Department of Biostatistics. She is also an adjunct professor at Boston University. Her research focuses on statistical genetics, genome-wide association studies, gene–environment interaction, rare-variant analysis, genetic meta-analysis and omics data integration, with applications including type 2 diabetes, pulmonary traits and cardiovascular disease.

== Education and career ==
Dupuis received a B.Sc. in statistics from Concordia University in 1990 and an M.Sc. in statistics from Stanford University in 1992. She received a Ph.D. in statistics from Stanford in 1994. Her doctoral dissertation, Statistical Problems Associated with Mapping Complex and Quantitative Traits from Genomic Mismatch Scanning Data, was supervised by David Siegmund.

From 1994 to 1997, Dupuis was an assistant professor at Northwestern University. She subsequently worked as a senior statistical geneticist at Genome Therapeutics Corporation in Waltham, Massachusetts, from 1997 to 2003. She joined Boston University School of Public Health in 2003, becoming an associate professor in 2003 and professor in 2008. She served as associate chair of the Department of Biostatistics from 2009 to 2015, interim chair from 2015 to 2016, and chair from 2017 until May 2022.

In June 2022, Dupuis joined McGill University as professor and chair of the Department of Epidemiology, Biostatistics and Occupational Health. She subsequently became the Strathcona Chair in Epidemiology.

== Research ==
Dupuis develops and applies statistical and computational methods for genetic and genomic data. Her research has included methods for genome-wide association studies, gene–environment interaction, genetic meta-analysis, rare genetic variants and integration of multiple omics data sets. A recurring focus of her work is the analysis of genetic data from related individuals and the use of family information to improve genetic association studies.

She has been involved in research using data from the Framingham Heart Study and the Trans-Omics for Precision Medicine (TOPMed) program, including studies of genetic factors associated with diabetes-related traits, pulmonary function and cardiovascular phenotypes.

Her recent work has included statistical methods for genetic colocalization and multi-ancestry genetic analysis. In 2024, she co-authored work introducing the SharePro method for genetic colocalization while accounting for multiple causal signals and genetic effect heterogeneity, including applications to gene–environment interactions.

In 2026, Dupuis co-authored a study in PLOS Genetics proposing multi-ancestry approaches to genetic colocalization. The methods combine multi-ancestry fine-mapping with established single-ancestry colocalization methods and were applied to type 2 diabetes genome-wide association data and protein quantitative trait loci data.

Other recent collaborative studies have examined genetic and molecular factors associated with type 2 diabetes, cardiovascular disease, lung function and neurological traits. Publications in 2025 and 2026 include studies of sex-stratified polygenic risk scores for type 2 diabetes, cardiometabolic effects of fasting-insulin-related genetic variants, multi-trait rare-variant analysis, lung-function decline and genetic factors associated with diabetes and glycemic traits.

== Recognition ==
Dupuis was elected a Fellow of the American Statistical Association in 2013 for contributions to statistical methods for genetics data, collaborative research on human complex disease genes, and service at the interface of statistics, genetic epidemiology and medicine. She was elected a Fellow of the American Association for the Advancement of Science in 2014 for contributions to statistical genetics.

She served as president of the International Genetic Epidemiology Society in 2016, after serving as president-elect in 2015. In 2019, she received the International Genetic Epidemiology Society Leadership Award.

In 2020, Dupuis received the American Society of Human Genetics Mentorship Award for sustained contributions to mentoring graduate students, postdoctoral fellows and other researchers. The award included a $10,000 prize.

In 2024, she was elected a Fellow of the Institute of Mathematical Statistics for contributions to statistical genetics, including work on complex traits and interactions, as well as mentoring and leadership in the statistics and genetics communities.

Dupuis has also held leadership positions in professional statistical organizations. She was elected to the board of directors of the Statistical Society of Canada as the Quebec regional representative for 2024–2026 and served as president-elect of its Biostatistics Section in 2025. In 2026 she became president of the section for the 2026–27 term.

== Selected publications ==
- Zhang, W.; Sladek, R.; Li, Y.; Najafabadi, H.; Dupuis, J. "Accounting for genetic effect heterogeneity in fine-mapping and improving power to detect gene-environment interactions with SharePro." Nature Communications, 2024.
- Zhang, W.; Lu, T.; Sladek, R.; Li, Y.; Najafabadi, H.; Dupuis, J. "SharePro: an accurate and efficient genetic colocalization method accounting for multiple causal signals." Bioinformatics, 2024.
- Shen, C.; Dupuis, J.; Zhang, Q. "Multi-ancestry colocalization approaches." PLOS Genetics, 2026.
- Dupuis J, Langenberg C, Prokopenko I, Saxena R, Soranzo N, Jackson AU, Wheeler E, Glazer NL, Bouatia-Naji N, Gloyn AL, Lindgren CM, Mägi R, Morris AP, Randall J..et.al, New genetic loci implicated in fasting glucose homeostasis and their impact on type 2 diabetes risk. Nat Genet. 2010 Feb;42(2):105-16. doi: 10.1038/ng.520. Epub 2010 Jan 17. Erratum in: Nat Genet.2010 May;42(5):464. PMID: 20081858; PMCID: PMC3018764.
