= Peter J. Gomes =

American theologian (1942–2011)

Peter John Gomes (May 22, 1942 – February 28, 2011) was an American Mainline Protestant preacher and theologian, the Plummer Professor of Christian Morals at Harvard Divinity School and Pusey Minister at Harvard's Memorial Church — in the words of Harvard's president "one of the great preachers of our generation, and a living symbol of courage and conviction."

== Biography ==
Gomes was born in Plymouth, Massachusetts, the only child of Orissa, née White, and Peter Lobo Gomes. His father was from the Cape Verde islands and his mother was African American. DNA testing revealed that he was likely descended from the Tikar from Cameroon and Fulani and Hausa peoples of West Africa, and that his patrilineal line likely leads to some Sephardic Jewish kohen ancestry. He was baptized as a Roman Catholic, but later became an American Baptist.

Gomes, a Plymouth High School graduate, worked as a houseman to help pay for his education. After earning his AB from Bates College, a coed liberal arts institution, in 1965, and a BD from Harvard Divinity School in 1968, Gomes was ordained by the First Baptist Church of Plymouth, Massachusetts, (where he occasionally preached throughout his life). After a two-year tenure at the Tuskegee Institute, he returned in 1970 to Harvard, where he became Pusey Minister in Harvard's nondenominational Memorial Church, and in 1974 was made Plummer Professor of Christian Morals.

In 2000, he delivered the University Sermon at the University of Cambridge and the Millennial Sermon in Canterbury Cathedral, and presented the Beecher Lectures on Preaching at Yale Divinity School.

Gomes was also a visiting professor at Duke University and the University of North Carolina, Chapel Hill. Profiled by Robert Boynton in The New Yorker, and interviewed by Morley Safer on 60 Minutes, Gomes was included in the premiere issue of Talk magazine as part of its feature article, "The Best Talkers in America: Fifty Big Mouths We Hope Will Never Shut Up."

Gomes was a long-time member of Plymouth's Old Colony Club, where his memory is still honored with an annual event.

Hospitalized after a stroke in December, 2010, Gomes hoped to return to Memorial Church in time for the following Easter. He died on February 28, 2011, of complications from the stroke.

Speakers at his memorial service at the Memorial Church on April 6, 2011, included Derek C. Bok, a former president of Harvard University; Drew Gilpin Faust, president of the university; and Deval Patrick, Governor of Massachusetts. On April 20, 2012, as part of the Harvard Foundation Portraiture Project, artist Stephen E. Coit unveiled his portrait of Gomes standing in the library of the Signet Society, where it now hangs.

== Theology, theography, social advocacy, and politics ==
External videos
- Booknotes interview with Gomes on The Good Book: Reading the Bible With Mind and Heart, September 21, 1997, C-SPAN
- Presentation by Gomes on Sermons: Biblical Wisdom for Daily Living, May 6, 1998, C-SPAN
- Presentation by Gomes on The Scandalous Gospel of Jesus, November 26, 2007, C-SPAN

Listed by Time Magazine in 1979 as one of "seven stars of the pulpit", Gomes fulfilled preaching and lecturing engagements throughout the United States and the United Kingdom.

In 2009, he represented Harvard University as lecturer at Cambridge University on the occasion of its 800th anniversary.

Gomes published a total of ten volumes of sermons, as well as numerous articles and papers. and two bestselling books, The Good Book: Reading the Bible with Mind and Heart and Sermons, Biblical Wisdom for Daily Living. The Right Reverend Lord Robert Runcie, 102nd Archbishop of Canterbury, England, ecclesiastical head of the Anglican Communion, said of Gomes's The Good Book that it "offers a crash course in biblical literacy in a nuanced but easy-to-understand style", which is also "lively"; Henry Louis Gates Jr. called it "Easily the best contemporary book on the Bible for thoughtful people".

His last work, The Scandalous Gospel of Jesus, included extensive commentary and observation on the interrelations of Church and State throughout history and particularly in recent US history.

In 1991 Gomes identified himself publicly as gay, though adding that he remained celibate, and became an advocate of acceptance of homosexuality in American society and particularly in religion. It was his self-declared goal to devote the rest of his life to "addressing the ‘religious case’ against gays." Same-sex marriage advocate Evan Wolfson described Gomes as an integral contributor to the cause of marriage equality.

He maintained that "one can read into the Bible almost any interpretation of morality ... for its passages had been used to defend slavery and the liberation of slaves, to support racism, anti-Semitism and patriotism, to enshrine a dominance of men over women, and to condemn homosexuality as immoral."

Gomes was a registered Republican for most of his life, and offered prayers at the inaugurals of United States Presidents Ronald Reagan and George H. W. Bush. In August 2006, he changed his registration to the Democratic Party (United States), supporting the candidacy of Deval Patrick, who was that year elected the first African-American governor of Massachusetts. Gomes and Patrick had become friends during Patrick's undergraduate days at Harvard.

According to a book on Martin Luther King Jr., Gomes "was never easy to label." Conservative evangelicals criticized his work at Harvard, yet he proudly featured a photograph of Billy Graham in his office at Harvard.

== Honors and tributes ==
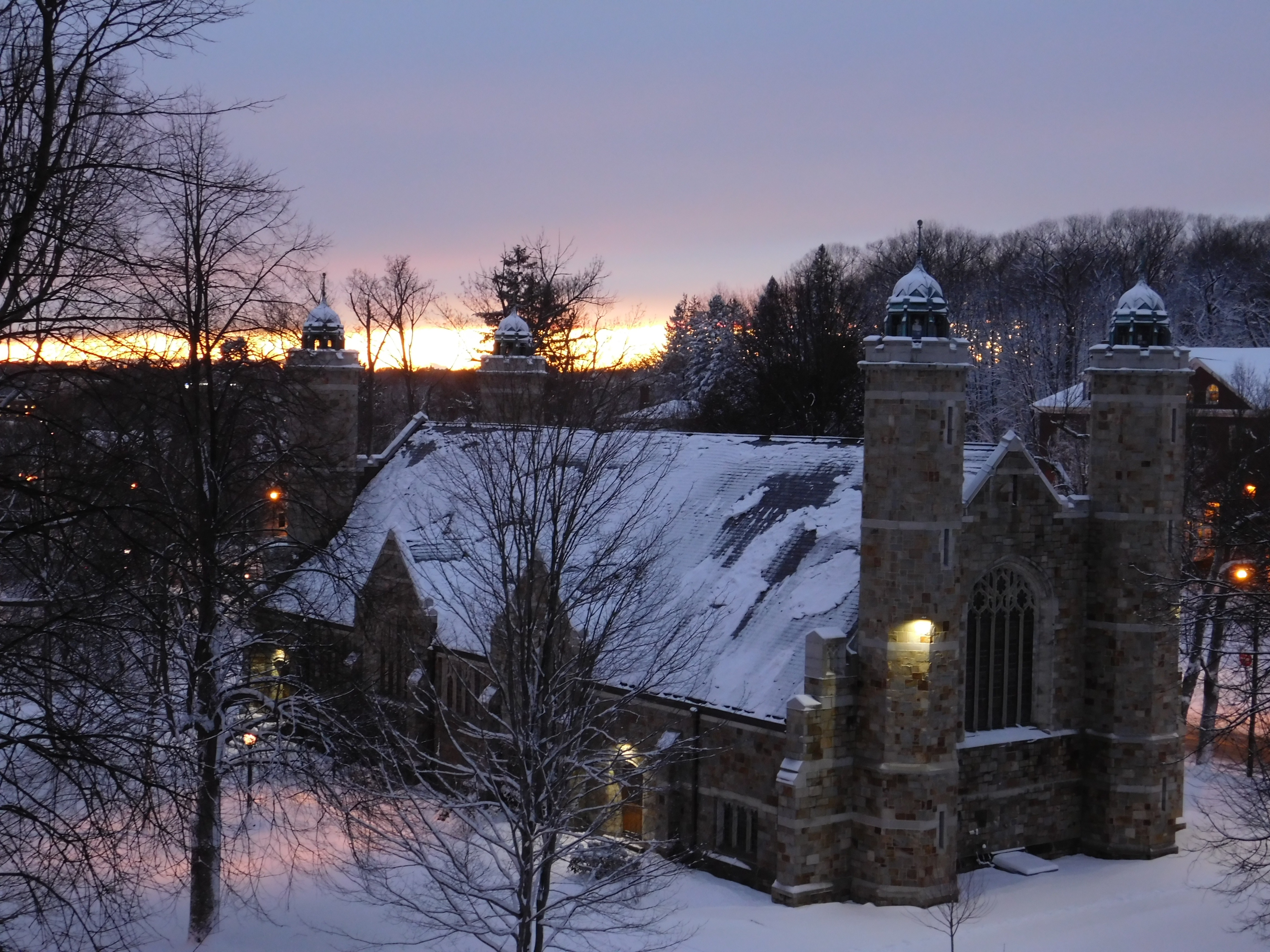
The Gomes Chapel, named after Gomes. The chapel is modeled after King's College Chapel, Cambridge.

- 1998: The Benjamin Elijah Mays Medal, Bates College
- 1998: Clergy of the Year by the organization Religion in American Life
- 2000: W. E. B. Du Bois Medal from Harvard University
- 2008: Gomes and his family were featured by Henry Louis Gates on the PBS documentary African American Lives 2.
- 2010: Gomes gave the Princeton Lectures on Youth, Church, and Culture; Harvard University elected him Honorary President of the Alpha-Iota chapter of Phi Beta Kappa.
- Gomes served as a trustee of the National Cathedral School, Washington, D.C.; as Harvard University trustee of the Museum of Fine Arts, Boston; and a trustee of the Roxbury Latin School and of Bates College

He was a member of the Massachusetts Historical Society, the Colonial Society of Massachusetts, and a sometime Fellow of the Royal Society of Arts.

He was a former acting director of the Hutchins Center for African and African American Research at Harvard University; he was past president of Harvard's Signet Society; and a former trustee of Bates College, Wellesley College and the Public Broadcasting Service. He was past president and trustee of the Pilgrim Society in Plymouth, Massachusetts.

On April 26, 1998, Gomes was a guest preacher at Central Congregational Church in Providence, Rhode Island.

- In 2007 he was appointed by Queen Elizabeth to membership in The Most Venerable Order of the Hospital of St. John of Jerusalem.
- Gomes received at least forty honorary degrees.
- 2009: Gomes gave the Lowell Lectures of Massachusetts and was named an Honorary Fellow of Emmanuel College, Cambridge University (England), where "The Gomes Lectureship" was established in his name.

== Publications ==
Gomes published numerous articles and papers, as well as at least a dozen books (some of them best-sellers), including:

- The Good Book: Reading the Bible with mind and heart (1996);
- Sermons: Biblical Wisdom for Daily Living (1998);
- The Good Life: Truths that Last in Times of Need (2002);
- Strength for the Journey: Biblical wisdom for Daily Living (2003);
- The Scandalous Gospel of Jesus: What's so good about the Good News? (2007);
- A Word to the Wise, and Other Sermons Preached at Harvard (2008).
