= Sutton Monro =

American statistician and engineer (1919–1995)

- Born: November 15, 1919; Burlington, Vermont, U.S.
- Died: March 5, 1995 (aged 75); South Burlington, Vermont, U.S.
- Education: MIT; University of North Carolina at Chapel Hill (attended)
- Known for: Robbins–Monro algorithm
- Relatives: John U. Monro (brother)
- Scientific career
- Workplaces: University of Maine at Orono; Bell Labs; Lehigh University

Sutton Monro (November 15, 1919 – March 5, 1995) was an American statistician and engineer. He was a long-time faculty member at Lehigh University and is known for the Robbins-Monro algorithm, which is the foundation of stochastic approximation.

== Education and career ==
Monro was born in Burlington, Vermont to Claxton Monro, a Harvard-trained chemist working at American Woolen Company, and Frances Sutton Monro. He was the youngest of the couple's three children. The Monro family were members of the Clan Munro. John U. Monro, a former dean of Harvard College, was a brother of Sutton Monro.

Monro attended the Philips Andover Academy and Cambridge High and Latin School, followed by Massachusetts Institute of Technology, where he graduated with a bachelor's degree from the Department of Business and Engineering Administration in 1942. He was enlisted in the US Navy during war times and fought in World War II. After the war, he taught mathematics at the University of Maine at Orono from 1946 to 1948. Monro then enrolled himself at the University of North Carolina at Chapel Hill in the fall of 1948 to pursue a doctoral study in statistics. Originally, he was interested in working under Harold Hotelling, but after talking to multiple other faculties, in 1949, he decided to work with a newer faculty member, Herbert Robbins, as his supervisor for a sequential analysis problem Monro proposed. Robbins was about a year younger than Monro, during the next years, Monro had a personal conflict with Robbins when he was made aware that Robbins was communicating with Jacob Wolfowitz and Jack Kiefer, then at Columbia University, about the results he was working on. Robbins published the work in September 1951, before Monro finished his Ph.D. (now called the Robbins-Monro algorithm), a year before Kiefer and Wolfowitz, who came to a more general version. The rule at the time at University of North Carolina at Chapel Hill prevented students to publish their doctoral work before being awarded their degree. This means that Monro never received his Ph.D.

After leaving Chapel Hill, Monro was enlisted again in the navy during the Korean War. From 1953 to 1959, Monro worked at the Bell Labs in Murray Hill, New Jersey and New York City, where he was a quality control engineer. In 1959, Monro was hired by Arthur F. Gould to join the department of industrial and systems engineering at Lehigh University as an associate professor. He was promoted to full professorship in 1964. Monro stayed for over two decades at Lehigh University and retired from there in 1985. After retirement, he moved back to Vermont and died in South Burlington in1995.

In 1953, Monro was elected a member of the Institute of Mathematical Statistics. In 1962, he was elected a member of the Society for Industrial and Applied Mathematics. He was also a member of the American Society for Quality Control.
