= Cyrus Derman =

American mathematician (1925–2011)

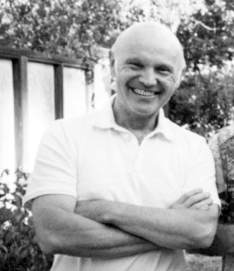
- Derman at Stanford in 1986
- Born: July 16, 1925; Collingdale, Pennsylvania, US
- Died: April 27, 2011 (aged 85); Carmel, New York, US
- Education: Columbia University; University of Pennsylvania
- Known for: Markov decision process Stochastic process Operations Research
- Awards: John von Neumann Theory Prize (2002); Fellow, ASA, IMS
- Scientific career
- Fields: Operations Research
- Workplaces: Columbia University
- Doctoral advisor: Kai-Lai Chung
- Other academic advisors: Herbert Robbins; Ted Harris
- Notable students: Michael N. Katehakis; Morton Klein; Sheldon M. Ross; Kiran Seth; Arthur F. Veinott, Jr.

Cyrus Derman (July 16, 1925 – April 27, 2011) was an American mathematician and amateur musician who did research in Markov decision process, stochastic processes, operations research, statistics and a variety of other fields.

== Early life ==
Derman grew up in Collingdale Pennsylvania. He was the son of a grocery store owner who came to the US from Lithuania. As a young boy he was often invited to play the violin at a Philadelphia radio show for talented children. Although his initial dream was to become a concert violinist, in the end he chose to study mathematics. Indeed, after he finished his undergraduate degree at the University of Pennsylvania in music and mathematics, he went on to Columbia University for his graduate work in mathematical statistics. At Columbia he was privileged to work with many of the important US statisticians and probabilists of that time.

== Career ==
After taking his Ph.D., Derman joined the Department of Industrial Engineering at Columbia University in 1954 as an instructor in Operations Research. He rose to the rank of Professor of Operations Research in 1965 and retired in 1992. He was a key figure in operations research at Columbia during his 38 years there. He was instrumental in the formation of the Columbia Industrial Engineering and Operations Research Department in 1977, which rose to be one of the top departments in that field. In addition, professor Derman held visiting appointments and taught at Syracuse University, Stanford University, University of California Berkeley, University of California Davis, Imperial College (London) and The Technion (Israel). Dr. Derman was an excellent teacher at all levels who managed to make difficult ideas easy for students to learn. He was also a dedicated and helpful advisor to 17 Ph.D. students and he has 260 descendants listed at the Mathematics Genealogy Project.

Dr. Derman did fundamental research in Markov decision processes, i.e., sequential decisions under uncertainty, including an important book on the subject. He also did significant work in optimal maintenance, stochastic assignment, surveillance, quality control, clinical trials, queueing and inventory depletion management among others. For his sustained fundamental contributions to theory in operations research and the management sciences, he was a co-recipient of the 2002 John von Neumann Theory Prize of the Institute for Operations Research and the Management Science. His significant contributions to probability and statistics which were recognized by his election as a Fellow of the Institute of Mathematical Statistics and the American Statistical Association.

== Selected writings ==
Books by Cyrus Derman:

- "Statistical aspects of quality control", with Sheldon M. Ross, 1997.
- "Probability models and applications", with L. Gleser and I. Olkin, 1994.
- "A guide to probability theory and application", with L. Gleser and I. Olkin, 1973,
- "Finite state Markovian decision processes", 1970.
- "Probability and statistical inference for engineers: a first course", with M. Klein, 1959.

Articles, a selection:

- A solution to a set of fundamental equations in Markov chains, in "Proc. Amer. Math. Soc", Vol. 5 1954.
- The strong law of large numbers when the first moment does not exist, with H. Robbins in "Proceedings of the National Academy of Sciences", Vol. 41(8) 1955.
- Some Contributions to the Theory of Denumerable Markov Chains in "Transactions of the American Mathematical Society", Vol. 79(2) 1955.
- Non-recurrent random walks, with Kai-Lai Chung in "Pacific Journal of Mathematics", Vol. 6(3), 1956.
- Stochastic Approximation, "The Annals of Mathematical Statistics", Vol. 27(4), 1956.
- Tightened Multi-Level Continuous Sampling Plans with S. Littauer and H. Solomon in "The Annals of Mathematical Statistics", Vol. 28(2), 1957.
- Inventory depletion management, with M. Klein in "Management Science", Vol. 4(4), 1958.
- On Dvoretzky's Stochastic Approximation Theorem with J. Sacks, in "The Annals of Mathematical Statistics", Vol. 30(2), 1959.
- Replacement of periodically inspected equipment.(An optimal optional stopping rule) with J. Sacks, in "Naval research logistics quarterly", Vol. 7 (4), 1960.
- On sequential decisions and Markov chains, in "Management Science", Vol. 9(1), 1962.
- A note on memoryless rules for controlling sequential control processes with R.E. Strauch in "The Annals of Mathematical Statistics", Vol. 37 (1), 1966.
- On getting close to but not beyond a boundary with E. Ignall in "Journal of Mathematical Analysis and Applications", Vol. 28, 1969.
- Constrained Markov decision chains, with A.F. Veinott Jr. in "Management Science", Vol. 19(4), 1972.
- A Sequential Stochastic Assignment Problem with G.J. Lieberman and S.M. Ross, "Management Science", Vol. 18(7) 1972.
- A renewal decision problem with G.J. Lieberman and S.M. Ross, "Management Science", 1978
- On the evaluation of a class of inventory policies for perishable products such as blood, with E. Brodheim and G. Prastacos, "Management Science", Vol. 21(11), 1975.
- On the consecutive-k-of-n: F system with G.J. Lieberman and S.M. Ross, "IEEE Transactions on Reliability", Vol. 31 (1), 1982.
- On the Use of Replacements to Extend System Life with G.J. Lieberman and S.M. Ross, in "Operations Research, Vol. 32(3), 1984.
- Computing optimal sequential allocation rules in clinical trials, with Katehakis, M.N., "IMS Lecture Notes-Monograph Series", 1986.
- On the maintenance of systems composed of highly reliable components with Katehakis, M.N., in "Management Science", Vol. 9(4), 1989.
- An Improved Estimator of σ in Quality Control with Ross, S.M. in "Probability in the Engineering and Informational Sciences", Vol. 9 (3), 1995.

== Awards ==
In 1966 Derman was elected as a Fellow of the American Statistical Association. He was awarded the John von Neumann Theory Prize in 2002.
