= Florence Ladd =

American educator and administrator

- Born: Florence Cawthorne; June 16, 1932; Washington, D.C., US
- Education: Howard University; University of Rochester (Ph.D.)
- Occupations: Educator, author
- Organizations: Bunting Institute
- Notable work: Sarah's Psalm (1996)

Florence Ladd (born June 16, 1932) is the Director Emeritus of the Bunting Institute and the author of the novel Sarah's Psalm.

== Biography ==
Ladd was born in Washington, D.C. Her parents were both educators and she grew up in Washington, D.C. She attended Howard University, graduating in 1953 and then the University of Rochester, earning a Ph.D. in psychology in 1958.

Ladd began her academic career teaching at Simmons College in Boston. She then taught at Harvard University's graduate school. In 1977, she began working at the Massachusetts Institute of Technology (MIT), where she became involved with administration and served as dean at the MIT School of Architecture. She was the dean of students at Wellesley College until 1984.

Ladd left academia for a time, working at Oxfam America as well as the South African Education Program for the Institute of International Education and the School for International Training.

In 1989, she became the director of the Bunting Institute at Harvard University, a position she held until 1997. She is now Director Emeritus. In 1994, she served on the executive committee for the conference Black Women in the Academy: Defending Our Name 1894–1994 held at MIT.

In 1996, Ladd's novel Sarah's Psalm was published by Charles Scribner's Sons. It won the 1997 Black Caucus of the American Library Association's literary award for fiction. In 1998, Ladd was the recipient of a MacDowell fellowship.

In 2008, Stephen E. Coit painted Ladd's portrait. It hangs in Lowell House at Harvard.
