= David Siegmund =

American statistician

David O. Siegmund
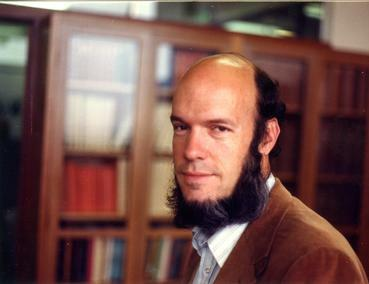
- Born: November 15, 1941 (age 84); St. Louis, Missouri, US
- Education: Columbia University
- Scientific career
- Fields: Statistics
- Workplaces: Stanford University
- Doctoral advisor: Herbert Robbins
- Doctoral students: Josée Dupuis; Eleanor Feingold; Hyune-Ju Kim; Tze Leung Lai; Steven Lalley; Jiayang Sun; Nancy R. Zhang

David Oliver Siegmund (born November 15, 1941) is an American statistician who has worked extensively on sequential analysis.

== Biography ==
Siegmund grew up in Webster Groves, Missouri. He received his baccalaureate degree, in mathematics, from Southern Methodist University in 1963, and a doctorate in statistics from Columbia University in 1966. His Ph.D. advisor was Herbert Robbins. After being an assistant and then a full professor at Columbia, he went to Stanford University in 1976, where he is currently a professor of statistics. He has served twice as the chair of Stanford's statistics department. He has also held visiting positions at Hebrew University of Jerusalem, the University of Zurich, the University of Oxford, and the University of Cambridge.

== Work ==
Siegmund has written with Herbert Robbins and Yuan-Shih Chow on the theory of optimal stopping. Much of his work has been on sequential analysis, and he has also worked on the statistics of gene mapping.

== Awards and honors ==
- Guggenheim Fellowship (1974)
- Humboldt Prize (1980)
- Elected to the American Academy of Arts and Sciences (1994)
- Invited Speaker of the International Congress of Mathematicians (1998)
- Elected to the National Academy of Sciences (2002)
- C. R. and Bhargavi Rao Prize in Statistics (2023)

== Selected publications ==
- (with Y. S. Chow and H. Robbins) Great Expectations: The Theory of Optimal Stopping, Boston: Houghton Mifflin, 1971.
- (with Rupert Miller) Maximally Selected Chi Square Statistics, Biometrics, 38, #4 (December 1982), pp. 1011–1016.
- Sequential Analysis: Tests and Confidence Intervals, New York: Springer, 1985, ISBN 0-387-96134-8.
- (with John D. Storey and Jonathan E. Taylor) Strong control, conservative point estimation and simultaneous conservative consistency of false discovery rates: a unified approach, Journal of the Royal Statistical Society, Series B 66, #1 (February 2004), pp. 187–205, doi:10.1111/j.1467-9868.2004.00439.x.
