= Eleanor Feingold =

American statistical geneticist and researcher

- Education: Massachusetts Institute of Technology; Stanford University (PhD)
- Scientific career
- Fields: Statistics
- Workplaces: Pacific Gas and Electric Company; Emory University; University of Pittsburgh
- Thesis: Modeling a New Genetic Mapping Method (1993)
- Doctoral advisor: David Siegmund

Eleanor Feingold is an American statistical geneticist. She is the dean of the Oregon State University College of Science.

Feingold's research results include the discovery that the human genome includes at least 49 different genes that contribute to the shape of the earlobe.

== Education and career ==
Feingold graduated from the Massachusetts Institute of Technology in 1985, with an interdisciplinary bachelor's degree that combined mathematics, public policy, and English. She completed a Ph.D. in statistics at Stanford University in 1993. Her dissertation, Modeling a New Genetic Mapping Method, was supervised by David Siegmund.

After her bachelor's degree, and continuing part-time into her graduate studies, she worked as a mathematician and statistician for the Pacific Gas and Electric Company. After completing her doctorate she became an assistant professor of biostatistics at Emory University. She moved to the University of Pittsburgh in 1997, became a full professor and associate dean there in 2010, and was named executive associate dean in 2015. In 2023 she was hired by Oregon State University to become dean of the Oregon State University College of Science.

== Recognition ==
In 2010 Feingold was named a Fellow of the American Statistical Association.
