= Janet Tate =

South African and American physicist

- Education: B.Sc. Hons, University of KwaZulun-Natal, South Africa M.S., Stanford University Ph.D., Stanford University
- Awards: Dr. Russ and Dolores Gorman Faculty Scholar (2015-2020) OSU Alumni Distinguished Professor (2015) Fellow, American Physical Society (2015) OSU Alumni Association Distinguished Professor Award (2015) F. A. Gilfillan Memorial Award for Distinguished Scholarship in Science (2015)
- Scientific career
- Workplaces: Strathclyde University (1995-1996) Oregon State University (1989-present)

Janet Tate is a condensed-matter physicist and materials scientist whose research is centered on transparent semiconductors and their application in the design of electroluminescent devices, solar cells, and thin film electronics. Originally from South Africa, and educated in South Africa and the US, she has worked in Germany and the US, where she is University Distinguished Professor of Physics at Oregon State University.

== Education and career ==
Tate studied physics and chemistry at the University of Natal in South Africa, earning a bachelor's degree in 1980 and honor degree in physics in 1981. She came to Stanford University in 1982 as a Fulbright Scholar, earned a master's degree in physics in 1984, and completed her Ph.D. in 1988 under the supervision of Blas Cabrera Navarro. Her doctoral research, initially intended as a calibration check for the Gravity Probe B experiment, discovered an anomalously large mass for Cooper pairs of electrons in a rotating superconductor, sparking subsequent interest in gravitoelectromagnetism.

Next, with the support of a Humboldt Fellowship, she became a postdoctoral researcher at the Technical University of Munich, working there with Helmut Kinder on high-temperature superconductivity. She joined Oregon State University as an assistant professor of physics in 1989, and was granted tenured as an associate professor in 1994. In 2002, she was promoted to full professor, and took a second courtesy appointment as a professor of chemistry. She was named a distinguished professor in 2018.

== Textbook ==
Tate is the coauthor of the physics textbook Quantum Mechanics: A Paradigms Approach (Pearson, 2012, with David H. McIntyre and Corinne Manogue).

== Recognition ==
Tate was named as a Fellow of the American Physical Society (APS) in 2015, after a nomination from the APS Division of Condensed Matter Physics, "for contributions to structural, transport, and optical properties of a wide variety of electronic and superconducting materials".
