= Nearly completely decomposable Markov chain =

In probability theory, a nearly completely decomposable (NCD) Markov chain is a Markov chain where the state space can be partitioned in such a way that movement within a partition occurs much more frequently than movement between partitions. Particularly efficient algorithms exist to compute the stationary distribution of Markov chains with this property.

== Definition ==
Ando and Fisher define a completely decomposable matrix as one where "an identical rearrangement of rows and columns leaves a set of square submatrices on the principal diagonal and zeros everywhere else." A nearly completely decomposable matrix is one where an identical rearrangement of rows and columns leaves a set of square submatrices on the principal diagonal and small nonzeros everywhere else.

== Example ==
A Markov chain with transition matrix

$$P =
\begin{pmatrix}
\frac{1}{2} & \frac{1}{2} & 0 & 0 \\
\frac{1}{2} & \frac{1}{2} & 0 & 0 \\
0 & 0 & \frac{1}{2} & \frac{1}{2} \\
0 & 0 & \frac{1}{2} & \frac{1}{2} \\
\end{pmatrix} + \epsilon \begin{pmatrix}
-\frac{1}{2} & 0 & \frac{1}{2} & 0 \\
0 & -\frac{1}{2} & 0 & \frac{1}{2} \\
\frac{1}{2} & 0 & -\frac{1}{2} & 0 \\
0 & \frac{1}{2} & 0 & -\frac{1}{2} \\
\end{pmatrix}$$

is nearly completely decomposable if ε is small (say 0.1).

== Stationary distribution algorithms ==
Special-purpose iterative algorithms have been designed for NCD Markov chains though the multi–level algorithm, a general purpose algorithm, has been shown experimentally to be competitive and in some cases significantly faster.

== See also ==
- Lumpability
