= Vrushali Bokil =

American applied mathematician

Vrushali Avinash Bokil is an Indian and American applied mathematician whose research concerns numerical methods for partial differential equations, especially those modeling wave propagation, the spread of invasive species, and plant diseases. She is a professor of mathematics and executive associate dean in the College of Science at Oregon State University.

== Education and career ==
Bokil writes that she planned to become a professor since she was 15 years old. She did her undergraduate studies in mathematics at the University of Poona in India. She has a 1996 master's degree in mathematics from New Mexico State University, and a 2003 Ph.D. in mathematics from the University of Houston. Her doctoral dissertation, Computational Methods for Wave Propagation Problems in Unbounded Domains, was supervised by Roland Glowinski.

After postdoctoral research with H. Thomas Banks at North Carolina State University, she became an assistant professor at Oregon State University in 2006. She was promoted to associate professor in 2012 and full professor in 2018. After serving as associate dean for research and graduate studies, she became the interim dean of the Oregon State University College of Science in 2022 and 2023.

== Recognition ==
Bokil was named as a Fellow of the Association for Women in Mathematics, in the 2027 class of fellows, "for her outstanding leadership and tireless advocacy to make mathematics more accessible to those underprivileged and underrepresented in STEM".
