= Hyune-Ju Kim =

Korean-American statistician

H. Hyune-Ju Kim is a Korean-American statistician known for her research on change point detection, segmented regression, and applications to the analysis of mortality and incidence of cancer. She is a professor in the department of mathematics at Syracuse University.

Kim earned a bachelor's degree in mathematics from Seoul National University in 1983, and completed a Ph.D. in statistics at Stanford University in 1988. Her dissertation, Change-Point Problems in Regression, was supervised by David Siegmund. She joined Syracuse University as an assistant professor in 1989, and became full professor there in 2009.
