= Lumpability =

In probability theory, lumpability is a method for reducing the size of the state space of some continuous-time Markov chains, first published by Kemeny and Snell.

== Definition ==
Suppose that the complete state-space of a Markov chain is divided into disjoint subsets of states, where these subsets are denoted by t_{i}. This forms a partition $\scriptstyle{T = \{ t_1, t_2, \ldots \}}$ of the states. Both the state-space and the collection of subsets may be either finite or countably infinite. A continuous-time Markov chain $\{ X_i \}$ is lumpable with respect to the partition T if and only if, for any subsets t_{i} and t_{j} in the partition, and for any states n,n’ in subset t_{i},

$$\sum_{m \in t_j} q(n,m) = \sum_{m \in t_j} q(n',m) ,$$

where q(i,j) is the transition rate from state i to state j.

Similarly, for a stochastic matrix P, P is a lumpable matrix on a partition T if and only if, for any subsets t_{i} and t_{j} in the partition, and for any states n,n’ in subset t_{i},

$$\sum_{m \in t_j} p(n,m) = \sum_{m \in t_j} p(n',m) ,$$

where p(i,j) is the probability of moving from state i to state j.

== Example ==
Consider the matrix

$$P = \begin{pmatrix}
\frac{1}{2} & \frac{3}{8} & \frac{1}{16} & \frac{1}{16} \\
\frac{7}{16} & \frac{7}{16} & 0 & \frac{1}{8} \\
\frac{1}{16} & 0 & \frac{1}{2} & \frac{7}{16} \\
0 & \frac{1}{16} & \frac{3}{8} & \frac{9}{16} \end{pmatrix}$$

and notice it is lumpable on the partition t = {(1,2),(3,4)} so we write

$$P_t = \begin{pmatrix}
\frac{7}{8} & \frac{1}{8} \\
\frac{1}{16} & \frac{15}{16} \end{pmatrix}$$

and call P_{t} the lumped matrix of P on t.

== Successively lumpable processes ==
In 2012, Katehakis and Smit discovered the Successively Lumpable processes for which the stationary probabilities can be obtained by successively computing the stationary probabilities of a propitiously constructed sequence of Markov chains. Each of the latter chains has a (typically much) smaller state space and this yields significant computational improvements. These results have many applications reliability and queueing models and problems.

== Quasi–lumpability ==
Franceschinis and Muntz introduced quasi-lumpability, a property whereby a small change in the rate matrix makes the chain lumpable.

== See also ==
- Nearly completely decomposable Markov chain
