= The Rabbi Martin Katzenstein Award =

The Rabbi Martin Katzenstein Award was established in 1979 by the Harvard Divinity School Alumni/ae Association "to honor among its graduates one who exhibits a passionate and helpful interest in the lives of other people, an informed and realistic faithfulness, an embodiment of the idea that love is not so much a way of feeling as a way of acting, and a reliable sense of humor." It is named for Rabbi Martin Katzenstein, ThM '58, who was Acting Dean of Students when he died in 1970 and was passionately involved with the school for many years.

== Past recipients ==
- 2012: Professor Dudley Rose, M.Div. '83
- 2011: Rev. Carl R. Scovel, STB '57
- 2009: Lynne Landsberg, MTS '76
- 2008: Mary E. Hunt, MTS '74
- 2007: John Rugge, MTS '69
- 2006: Joe R. Feagin, BD '62, Ph.D. '66
- 2005: Bishop William B. Oden, BD '61
- 2004: Elyn MacInnis, M.Div. '77
- 2003: Dr. Oscar Allan Rogers, STB '53
- 2002: Paul D. Kennedy, STB '61
- 2001: Archbishop Iakovos, STM '45
- 2000: Carl R. Scovel, STB '57
- 1999: Archie C. Epps III, BD '61
- 1998: Letty Mandeville Russell, STB '58
- 1997: Richard Unsworth, Th.M. '63
- 1996: Janet Cooper Nelson, M.Div. '80
- 1995: Victor H. Carpenter, Jr., Merrill Fellow '74, B.Div. '75
- 1994: Scotty McLennan, M.Div. '75
- 1993: Samuel McMurray Keen, STB '56, Th.M. '58
- 1992: Charles G. Adams, BD '64
- 1991: Ruth B. Purtilo, MTS '75, Ph.D. '79
- 1990: Yehezkel Landau, MTS '76
- 1989: Henry C. Gregory, III, Th.M. '68
- 1988: Harry H. Hoehler, STB '54; Judith L. Hoehler, B.Div. '58
- 1987: James Luther Adams, STB '27
- 1986: Ralph Lazzaro, STB '40, STM '41
- 1985: Professor Amos N. Wilder, '30
- 1984: Jack Mendelsohn, STB '45
- 1983: Professor C. Conrad Wright, HDS Faculty
- 1982: Professor John B. Carman, HDS Faculty
- 1981: Elinor (Bunn) Thompson
- 1980: Henry V. Richardson, STB '32

== See also ==
- List of religion-related awards
