= Scotty McLennan =

American religious author, minister and academic (born 1948)

The Reverend Scotty McLennan
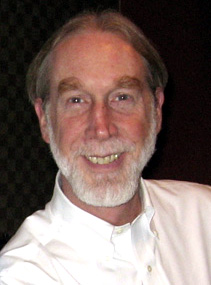
- McLennan in 2006
- Born: William L. McLennan, Jr. November 21, 1948 (age 77); Chicago, Illinois, U.S.
- Education: Yale University (BA)Phi Beta Kappa and Scholar of the House.; Harvard Law School (J.D.); Harvard Divinity School (M.Div.)
- Occupations: Author; professor; minister; lawyer
- Years active: 1975—present
- Employer: Stanford University
- Known for: author, public speaker, Dean for Religious Life at Stanford University, lecturer Stanford Graduate School of Business, Former Senior Lecturer Harvard Business School
- Spouse: Ellen S McLennan (1981–present)
- Children: 2
- Awards: The Rabbi Martin Katzenstein Award; Gandhi, King, Ikeda Award; The Hotchkiss School Lifetime Achievement Award/Alumni of the Year2018, Formerly Man of the Year Award

William L. McLennan, Jr. (born on November 21, 1948), better known as Scotty McLennan, is an American Unitarian Universalist minister, lawyer, professor, published author, public speaker and senior administrator at Stanford University in Stanford, California. From January 1, 2001 until August 2014, McLennan served as the Dean for Religious Life at Stanford University, where he oversaw campus-wide religious affairs, supervised over 30 university student groups that constituted the Stanford Associated Religions, and was the minister of Stanford Memorial Church. He currently teaches about the moral and ethical aspects of business leadership at the Stanford Graduate School of Business.

== Early life and education ==
Originally from Lake Forest, Illinois, McLennan is the son of William L. McLennan and Alice Polk Warner and the grandson of Donald R. McLennan, who co-founded Marsh & McLennan. He attended the Hotchkiss School in Connecticut. In 1970, he received his BA degree (magna cum laude and Phi Beta Kappa) from Yale University, where he was a member of the Wolf's Head Secret Society and played hockey for the Yale Bulldogs men's ice hockey team. Along with former Yale Chaplain and McLennan's mentor William Sloane Coffin, McLennan is the real-life inspiration for the Doonesbury cartoon character Reverend Scot Sloan in his college roommate Garry Trudeau's Pulitzer Prize-winning comic strip, which also was adapted into a film and nominated for an Academy Award for Best Animated Short Film.

His senior year at Yale, McLennan was chosen to be a "Scholar of the House", whereby he was exempt from attending class in order to focus the year on scholarly research. He graduated cum laude and was inducted into Phi Beta Kappa. For his graduate education, he earned both Master of Divinity (M.Div.) and Juris Doctor degrees cum laude from Harvard Divinity School and Harvard Law School respectively in 1975.

== Career ==
He was ordained in 1975 as a Unitarian Universalist minister (and is a Unitarian Universalist Christian), and admitted to the Massachusetts bar in 1975. After practicing church-sponsored poverty law in a low-income region of Boston for nearly ten years and founding the Unitarian Universalist Legal Ministry, he was appointed University Chaplain at Tufts University in Massachusetts, serving from 1984 to 2000, and senior lecturer at Harvard Business School, serving from 1988 to 2000. From 2001 until 2014, McLennan served as the Dean for Religious Life at Stanford University. Since 2003, McLennan has been teaching at the Stanford Graduate School of Business in Political Economy.

== Awards ==
In 1994, he was the recipient of The Rabbi Martin Katzenstein Award, the oldest annual award given to Harvard Divinity School Alumni "to honor among its graduates one who exhibits a passionate and helpful interest in the lives of other people."

McLennan was honored with the Gandhi, King, Ikeda Award in 2004. The award was "established to recognize leaders who promote peace and world reconciliation" by Morehouse College.

In 2018, McLennan was the recipient of The Hotchkiss School Alumni Award, the most prestigious and highest honor given to alumni. As stated by the school, which was founded in 1891, "The Nominating/Awards Committee of the Alumni Board of Governors seeks candidates who have made significant contributions in their fields and earned the recognition of their peers on a national or international level". Previous recipients include US Supreme Court Justices, US Governors, Nobel laureates, Pulitzer Prize winners and Academy Award Winners.

== Publications ==
McLennan's first book, Finding Your Religion: When the Faith You Grew Up With Has Lost Its Meaning, was published in 1999 by HarperCollins. His second book, Church on Sunday, Work on Monday: The Challenge of Fusing Christian Values with Business Life, was co-authored with Laura Nash and published in 2001 by Jossey-Bass. His third book, Jesus Was a Liberal: Reclaiming Christianity for All, was published by Palgrave-Macmillan on May 12, 2009. McLennan's fourth and most recent book, Christ for Unitarian Universalists: A New Dialogue with Traditional Christianity, was published by Skinner House Books on May 1, 2016.

In 2009, he went on a national book tour for Jesus Was a Liberal, presenting at more than a dozen book signings in Northern and Southern California, including a presentation for Authors@Google at the company's Mountain View, CA headquarters. Other book events took place in Chicago, Minneapolis, Dallas, Greenwich, CT, Boston, New York City and Washington, D.C.

== News and media ==
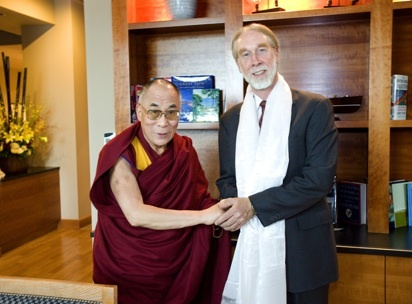
The Rev. Scotty McLennan with spiritual mentor, the Dalai Lama, pictured in 2008 in Seattle, Washington

A nationally prominent speaker on religion and ethics, McLennan has been featured in major news publications, such as USA Today, People Magazine, The Huffington Post, The Dallas Morning News, and The Boston Globe, as well as a guest on national and regional television and radio programs, including The CW Television Network, The O'Reilly Factor, National Public Radio and Sirius Satellite Radio.

== Personal life ==
Scotty McLennan is married to Ellen. They wed in 1981 in Boston, Massachusetts. They are the parents of two sons: Will McLennan (b. 1982) and Dan McLennan (b. 1984), both of whom are alumni of Stanford University.

During his tenure at Stanford, McLennan has hosted and publicly interviewed the Dalai Lama, a spiritual mentor, in 2005 and 2010 to discuss compassion and how to live a meaningful life.

He served on the board of directors for the Northern California branch of the American Civil Liberties Union.

From 1966–1967, McLennan played defense for the Yale Bulldogs men's ice hockey team.
