= Steven Lalley =

American mathematician (born 1954)

Steven Paul Lalley (born 16 January 1954) is an American statistician and mathematician.

Lalley graduated in 1976 with B.S. from Michigan State University. He received in 1981 his Ph.D. from Stanford University with thesis Repeated Likelihood Ratio Tests for Curved Exponential Families under the supervision of David Siegmund. After teaching at Columbia University and Purdue University, Lalley became in 1998 a professor of statistics at the University of Chicago and served as department chair from 2001 to 2005.

He was an associate editor for the Annals of Statistics from 1988 to 1991. For the Annals of Probability he was an associate editor from 1991 to 1996 and editor-in-chief from 2003 to 2005.

In 2012 Lalley was elected a Fellow of the American Mathematical Society. In 2006 he was an invited speaker at the International Congress of Mathematicians in Madrid.
