= Black Women in the Academy: Defending Our Name 1894–1994 =

Black Women in the Academy: Defending Our Name 1894–1994 was a national conference focusing on Black women academics held at the Massachusetts Institute of Technology (MIT) on January 13–15, 1994. This was the first national conference focusing on issues pertaining to Black female scholars. It was held 100 years after the National Federation of Negro Women met in Boston to create a national organization focusing on Black women's issues and to protest the popular image of Black womanhood in the press. The outcome of that meeting was the creation of the National Federation of Afro-American Women.

The 1994 conference was organized by Robin W. Kilson, MIT professor of history and women's studies, and Evelynn M. Hammonds, MIT professor of the history of science. The conference was inspired by Kilson's "personal frustration through the sense of isolation as a black woman" in higher education. The conference served as a large public forum of Black women academics to discuss issues of research, success and lack thereof in academia, and the repressive political climate of the 1980s and 1990s. About 1,500 Black women scholars attended from across the U.S., ranging from undergraduates to professors to college presidents. It was sponsored by MIT, Wellesley College and Radcliffe College, as well as other foundations. Florence Ladd served on the Executive Committee for the conference.

== Proceedings ==
The conference featured three keynote speakers: Lani Guinier from the University of Pennsylvania Law School, Dr. Johnnetta B. Cole, president of Spelman College; and Professor Angela Davis of the University of California Santa Cruz. Guinier, who had recently been withdrawn from nomination for assistant attorney general by President Bill Clinton, gave an opening speech to three standing ovations, stating that "what was happening to me was a metaphor for the experiences of many women of color". Davis gave the closing speech, arguing the importance of standing up for all Black women in the public eye. "While courageous people fought to make the walls of academia less impenetrable, these very victories have spawned new problems and foreshadow new troubles", she said.

The conference also featured over 100 panels, talks, and posters on topics ranging from Black women in film and literature, to race and gender politics in academic culture, to specialized research in various topics performed by Black female scholars. Vinie Burrows, performance artist, presented “Sister, Sister,” her one-woman show.

At the conference, attendants drafted an appeal to President Clinton, asking him to "commission a blue-ribbon panel on race relations; to promote Black women's research and extend the Glass Ceiling Commission to address the women of color in academia; to extend funding for community-based social service organizations for the poor; to end covert actions against Haiti and restore President Aristide to power, and to continue to support democracy in South and Southern Africa."
