= Roland Glowinski =

French-American mathematician (1937–2022)

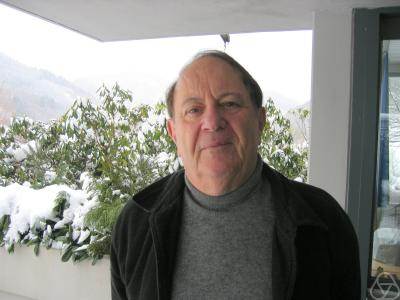
- Glowinski in 2006
- Born: 9 March 1937; Paris, France
- Died: 26 January 2022 (aged 84); Houston, Texas, United States
- Education: École Polytechnique; École Nationale Supérieure des Télécommunications; University of Paris VI
- Scientific career
- Fields: Computational and Applied Mathematics, Computational Mechanics and Physics
- Workplaces: University of Houston
- Doctoral advisor: Jacques-Louis Lions
- Doctoral students: Fatiha Alabau; Vrushali Bokil

Roland Glowinski (9 March 1937 – 26 January 2022) was a French-American mathematician. He obtained his PhD in 1970 from Jacques-Louis Lions and was known for his work in applied mathematics, in particular numerical solution and applications of partial differential equations and variational inequalities. He was a member of the French Academy of Sciences and held an endowed chair at the University of Houston from 1985. Glowinski wrote many books on the subject of mathematics. In 2012, he became a fellow of the American Mathematical Society.

== Selected publications ==
- with Jacques-Louis Lions and Raymond Trémolières: Numerical Analysis of variational inequalities, North Holland 1981 2011 pbk edition
- Numerical methods for nonlinear variational problems, Springer Verlag 1984, 2008; 2013 pbk edition
- with Michel Fortin: Augmented Lagrangian methods : applications to the numerical solution of boundary-value problems, North Holland 1983
- with Patrick Le Tallec: Augmented Lagrangian and operator-splitting methods in nonlinear mechanics, Society for Industrial and Applied Mathematics 1989
- Glowinski, R. (2003). Ciarlet, P. G.; Lions, J. L. (eds.). Numerical analysis for fluids (Part 3). Finite element methods for incompressible viscous flows. Handbook of Numerical Analysis, Vol. IX. North-Holland. ISBN 9780444512246.
- with Jacques-Louis Lions and Jiwen He: Exact and approximate controllability for distributed parameter systems: a numerical approach, Cambridge University Press 2008
