= Evelynn M. Hammonds =

American feminist and scholar (born 1953)

Evelynn Hammonds
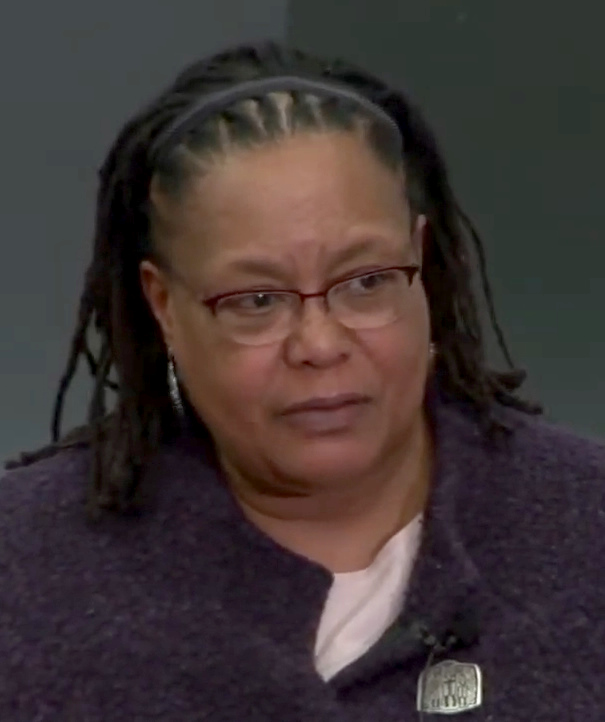
- Hammonds in 2017

Dean of Harvard College
- In office June 1, 2008 – July 1, 2013
- Preceded by: Benedict Gross; David Pilbeam (acting)
- Succeeded by: Donald Pfister (acting); Rakesh Khurana

Personal details
- Born: January 2, 1953 (age 73) Atlanta, Georgia, U.S.
- Education: Spelman College (BS); Georgia Institute of Technology (BS); Massachusetts Institute of Technology (MS); Harvard University (PhD)

Academic work
- Discipline: History
- Institutions: Massachusetts Institute of Technology; Harvard University

Evelynn Maxine Hammonds (born 1953) is an American historian of science and feminist scholar. She is the Barbara Gutmann Rosenkrantz Professor of the History of Science and a professor of African and African-American Studies at Harvard University, where she was dean of Harvard College from 2009 to 2013. The intersections of race, gender, science and medicine are prominent research topics across her published works. She began her teaching career at the Massachusetts Institute of Technology, later moving to Harvard. In 2008, Hammonds was appointed dean, the first African-American and the first woman to head the college. She returned to full-time teaching in 2013.

== Early life and education ==
Hammonds was born in Atlanta, Georgia on January 2, 1953, to Evelyn Baker Hammonds and William Hammonds Jr. Her mother was a schoolteacher, and her father was a postal worker. Her father aspired to become an engineer, after studying chemistry and mathematics, but was unable to attend the segregated Georgia Institute of Technology.

Hammonds initially attended Daniel McLaughlin Therrell High School, but completed her secondary education at Southwest High School due to discrimination from students and teachers. A National Merit Scholar, Hammonds attended Spelman College, where she enrolled in a joint engineering program with Georgia Institute of Technology. In 1976 she graduated from both universities with degrees in physics and electrical engineering, respectively. While she was an undergraduate, she spent two summers working at Bell Labs through a research fellowship program that recruited minorities in the sciences. It was during her work there that she became friends with Cecilia Conrad.

Following graduation, she attended the Massachusetts Institute of Technology (MIT) for a Ph.D. program but withdrew in 1980, earning a master's degree in physics instead. Upon leaving MIT, she began a five-year career as a software engineer, then attended Harvard University. In 1993, she graduated with a Ph.D. in the history of science.

== Career ==
Upon graduation from Harvard, Hammonds was invited to teach at MIT. While she was there, she was the founding director of MIT's center for the Study of Diversity in Science, Technology, and Medicine. She also helped organize the first national academic conference for black female scholars, Black Women in the Academy: Defending Our Name 1894–1994 a national conference convened at MIT in 1994 to address historical and contemporary issues faced by African-American women in academia.

In 2002, she returned to Harvard and joined as a professor in the departments of the History of Science and of African and African-American Studies. She became the Dean of Harvard College in 2008 and was the 4th black woman to receive tenure within the Faculty of Arts and Sciences at Harvard University. Before this, Hammonds had served as the first senior vice provost for Harvard's Faculty Development and Diversity.

In February 2022, Hammonds was one of 38 Harvard faculty to sign a letter to the Harvard Crimson defending Professor John Comaroff, who had been found to have violated the university's sexual and professional conduct policies. The letter defended Comaroff as "an excellent colleague, advisor and committed university citizen" and expressed dismay over his being sanctioned by the university. After students filed a lawsuit with detailed allegations of Comaroff's actions and the university's failure to respond, Hammonds was one of several signatories to say that she wished to retract her signature.

=== Research ===
Hammonds' research focuses on the intersection of science, medicine, and race. Many of her works analyze gender and races in the perspective of science and medicine. She is concerned with how science examines human variation through race. Hammonds mainly studies the time period of the 17th century to present while focusing on history of diseases and African-American feminism. In 1997, Hammond's article "Toward a Genealogy of Black Female Sexuality: The Problematic of Silence" was published in Feminist Theory and the Body: A Reader. In this article, Hammond focuses on the intersection of black female sexuality and AIDS. She argues that black female sexuality (from the 19th century to present) was formed in exact opposition to that of white women. She argues that, historically, many black feminists have failed to develop a concept of black female sexuality. Hammonds then discusses the limitations of black women's sexuality and how that affects black women with AIDS.

Hammonds believes black women are capable of more than their socially acceptable definition of their own sexuality, but yet they are unable to express it. This is a consequence of black women being unable to define sexuality in their own terms. She dates the earliest records of these definitions in the early 19th century with Sarah Baartman as the "Hottentot Venus". This was a black woman who was put on display and seen as vulgar because she had larger anatomical body parts than those of her white counterparts. Today, we still see the continuation of the effects of the association of black women with uncontrolled sexuality. This was largely in part due to the comparison of black women to Victorian white women. Black women were seen as hypersexual. White society thought that black female sexuality undermined the morals and values of their society.

During the late 19th and early 20th centuries, black women reformers were set on developing a new definition of black female sexuality. This new definition was an image of a super moral black female to align itself with the super moral Victorian women. These black women were set on deconstructing the hypersexual notion of the black female sexuality. Hammonds argues that by silencing the voice of the black female, the reformers oppressed black women without deconstructing the notion of the hypersexual connotation.

Hammonds states that in order for black women to be free from oppression, black women must reclaim their sexuality. The definition of black female sexuality was always defined by an outside group looking in, first by white males and then by white females. Black females must define their own sexuality in order to overcome oppression. She states that this repeated silence has become a notion of "invisibility" to describe black females' lives. Even women with prestige in academia are still under invisibility when they are told what issues they can and cannot lecture about. Hammonds continues to extend the "invisibility" of black women to the field of medicine and science. Black women have been oppressed for so many years that negative stereotypes have been formed about black women and now to black women with AIDS. These stereotypes have created a void between black women with AIDS and society. The public continues to hold black women up to the stereotype of hypersexual and black women with AIDS are forced to deal with this oppression.

In 1994 Hammonds published "Black (W)holes and the Geometry of Black Female Sexuality," an article extending and responding to Darlene Clark Hines's formulation of dissemblance, and Hortense Spillers's "Interstices: A Small Drama of Words". The article considers the silence of black female sexuality, particularly black lesbian sexuality, which she considers to be "doubly silenced." She uses physics and psychoanalysis to consider the void of black female sexuality and urges for a movement towards a "politics of articulation."

In 1995, Hammonds, together with other black feminists including Angela Davis, Barbara Ransby and Kimberlé Crenshaw, formed an alliance called the "African American Agenda 2000" to oppose Louis Farrakhan's Million Man March, out of concern that it would further black male sexism.

=== E-mail search scandal at Harvard ===
In March 2013, Hammonds and Harvard Faculty of Arts and Sciences dean Michael D. Smith announced that they had ordered a search of the email records of Harvard administrators in order to identify whether individuals had leaked information to the media regarding the university's investigation of the 2012 Harvard cheating scandal. Hammonds and Smith had asked the administrators whether or not they leaked any information to anybody, in response to The Crimson publishing a description of an internal email regarding the cheating scandal and athletes' eligibility. No administrators came forward; Hammonds and Smith informed these administrators that there would need to be additional investigation. In response, Hammonds and Smith ordered an email search and identified the individual responsible for disseminating these internal email communications.

The Harvard Crimson called on Hammonds to resign. Then, on May 28, Hammonds announced that she would resign to lead a new Harvard research program on race and gender in science. Hammonds said that her decision to resign was unrelated to the email search incident.

A review that the university commissioned from an outside law firm, released in July 2013, concluded that "FAS Administrators acting in good faith undertook [the email searches] in order to proceed with and complete the disciplinary proceedings of the Administrative Board and to protect the confidentiality of that process."

=== Notable publications ===
- Childhood's Deadly Scourge: The Campaign to Control Diphtheria in New York City, 1880 – 1930 (1999, Johns Hopkins University Press)
- The Nature of Difference: Sciences of Race in the United States from Jefferson to Genomics (2008, MIT Press)
- The Harvard Sampler: Liberal Education for the Twenty-first Century (2011, Harvard University Press)
- The Dilemma of Classification: The Past in the Present (2011, Rutgers University Press)

== Honors and distinctions ==
- President of the History of Science Society, 2024–2025
- Namesake of the Harvard LGBTQ Students at the Graduate School of Arts and Sciences Association's "Evelynn Hammonds Award for Exceptional Service to BGLTQ+ Inclusion", 2021
- Elected member of the American Academy of Arts & Sciences, 2021
- Election to the Bates College Board of Trustees, 2018
- Appointment to the Committee on Women in Science, Engineering, and Medicine of the National Academies of Sciences, Engineering, and Medicine, 2017
- History of Science Society Distinguished Lecturer, 2016
- Founder's Award, Lawyers' Committee for Civil Rights and Economic Justice, 2014
- Woman of Courage and Conviction Award, Greater Boston Chapter of the National Council of Negro Women, 2014
- Spelman College Ida B. Wells-Barnett Distinguished Lecturer, 2013
- Honorary Doctor of Humane Letters from Bates College, 2011
- Association for Women in Science Fellow, 2008
- Barbara Gutmann Rosenkrantz Professorship at Harvard University, 2007
- Honorary Doctor of Humane Letters from Spelman College, 2004
- Sigma Xi Distinguished Lecturer, 2003–05
