= Fatiha Alabau =

French applied mathematician

Fatiha Alabau-Boussouira (born 1961) is a French applied mathematician specializing in the control theory of partial differential equations. She is affiliated with the Laboratoire Jacques-Louis Lions of Sorbonne University as an external member, a professor at the University of Lorraine in the mathematics department of its Metz campus, and a former president of the Société de Mathématiques Appliquées et Industrielles, a French society for applied mathematics.

== Education and career ==
Alabau was born 27 August 1961 in Montmorency, Val-d'Oise. She earned a diplôme d'études approfondies in numerical analysis in 1984 at Pierre and Marie Curie University, where she defended her doctoral thesis in 1987 under the supervision of Roland Glowinski.

After postdoctoral research as a visiting assistant professor at Arizona State University, she became maître de conferences at the University of Bordeaux 1 in 1988, and earned a habilitation there in 1996. She became a professor at Louis Pasteur University in 1997, and moved to Paul Verlaine University – Metz (which later became part of the University of Lorraine) in 1999.

== Service and recognition ==
Alabau was president of the Société de Mathématiques Appliquées et Industrielles from 2014 to 2017.
