= Nancy R. Zhang =

American statistical geneticist

Nancy Ruonan Zhang is an American statistician, statistical geneticist, and genomics researcher. She is a Ge Li and Ning Zhao Professor, professor in the Department of Statistics and Data Science, and vice dean of doctoral programs at the Wharton School of the University of Pennsylvania.

== Education and career ==
Zhang was educated at Stanford University, where she graduated with a bachelor's degree in mathematics and master's degree in computer science in 2001. Continuing at Stanford, she completed a Ph.D. in statistics in 2005, with the support of a DoD NDSEG Fellowship. Her dissertation, Change-Point Models and Sequence Alignments: Statistical Problems of Genomics, was supervised by David Siegmund.

She became a postdoctoral researcher in statistics and plant biology at the University of California, Berkeley, mentored by Terry Speed and Mary Wildermuth, from 2005 to 2006. From 2006 to 2011 she returned to Stanford as an assistant professor of statistics, and was an affiliated faculty member at the University of Pennsylvania. In 2011 she obtained a regular-rank associate professor position at the University of Pennsylvania, in 2018 she was promoted to full professor, and in 2019 she was given the Ge Li and Ning Zhao Professorship. She has been vice dean since 2019. In 2014 she added an affiliation with the Abramson Cancer Center in the Perelman Center for Advanced Medicine.

== Recognition ==
Zhang was named as a Sloan Fellow in 2011. She was a Medallion Lecturer of the American Statistical Association in 2021.

She was a 2025 recipient of the David Cox Medal for Statistics, recognizing her research in "the analysis of high-dimensional biological data through the development of methods for change-point detection and false positive control, noise reduction in single-cell RNA sequencing, single cell and spatial omic data integration, ... cell type deconvolution in bulk tissue analysis, ... [and] understanding cancer genome evolution through the development of allele-specific DNA copy number estimation methods that reveal intratumor heterogeneity".
