= Archie Epps =

American academic administrator

Archie C. Epps III (May 19, 1937, Lake Charles, Louisiana – August 21, 2003, Boston, Massachusetts) was dean of students at Harvard College from 1970 to 1999. He was one of the first black administrators at Harvard.

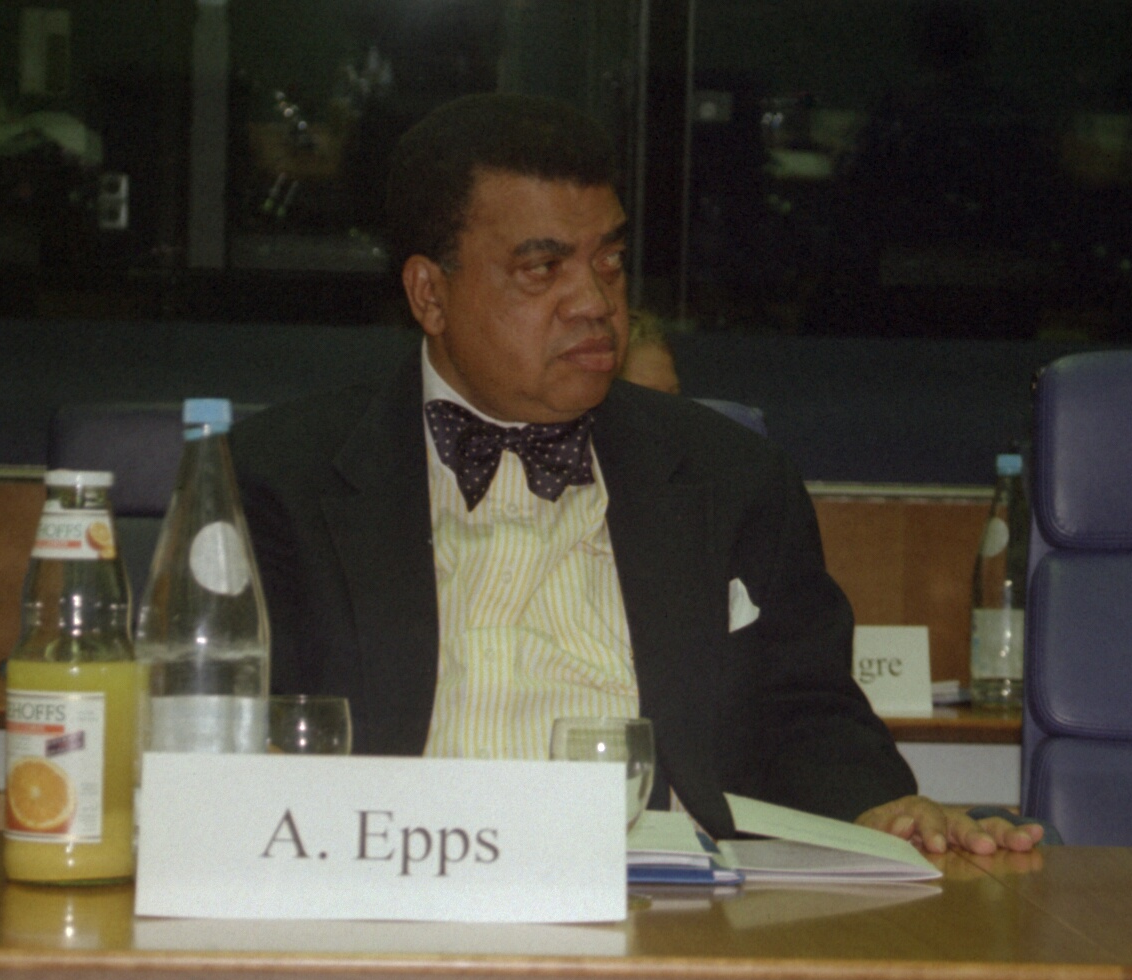

== Early life and education ==
Epps was born in Lake Charles, Louisiana in 1937, one of three sons. He attended Talladega College, a historically black college, and Harvard Divinity School.

== Marriage and family ==
He married Rae Pace Alexander, daughter of Sadie Tanner Mossell and Raymond Pace Alexander, both attorneys in Philadelphia. They divorced before 1971.

He married Valerie Epps, who is an attorney and professor at Suffolk Law School. They had two sons, Josiah and Caleb.

== Academic career ==
He taught at Harvard University in the Center for Middle Eastern Studies, where he was a specialist in Islam.

In 1964 Epps was appointed as Assistant Dean of Harvard College by John Usher Monro, becoming one of Harvard's first black administrators. In 1970 he became the college's Dean of Students, in which capacity he served until 1999.

== Books ==
- Edited The Speeches of Malcolm X at Harvard (Morrow, 1967), and published a new edition with a revised introduction in 1991.
- With Armand Clesse, president of the Harvard-Luxembourg Association, he co-edited ”Present at the Creation”: The Fortieth Anniversary of the Marshall Plan (Harper and Row, 1990), based on conferences he organized at Harvard in the 1980s and 1990s.
- 1992, Epps published Harvard's first handbook on race relations.

== Legacy and honors ==
- 1999, Epps received the Rabbi Martin Katzenstein Award
- 2004, he was posthumously awarded the Preston N. Williams Black Alumni/ae Award by Harvard Divinity School.
