= Tevian Dray =

American mathematician (born 1956)

- Born: March 17, 1956 (age 70); Washington, DC, United States
- Education: Massachusetts Institute of Technology BS 1976; University of California, Berkeley Ph.D 1981
- Spouse: Corinne A. Manogue
- Awards: Fellow, American Physical Society, Division of Gravitational Physics 2010; Mathematical Association of America, Deborah and Franklin Haimo Awards for Distinguished College or University Teaching of Mathematics, 2017
- Scientific career
- Workplaces: Oregon State University
- Doctoral advisor: Rainer K. Sachs

Tevian Dray (born March 17, 1956) is an American mathematician who has worked in general relativity, mathematical physics, geometry, and both science and mathematics education. He was elected a Fellow of the American Physical Society in 2010, cited For his contributions to the theory of general relativity, which include investigations of light-like surface layers and the physics of signature change.

He has primarily worked in the area of classical general relativity. His research results include confirmation of the existence of solutions of Einstein's equation containing gravitational radiation, the use of computer algebra to classify exact solutions of Einstein's equation, an analysis of a class of gravitational shock waves (including one of the few known exact 2-body solutions in general relativity), and the study of signature change, a possible model for the Big Bang. More recently, his work has focused on applications of the octonions to the theory of fundamental particles.

He was a graduate student under Rainer K. Sachs at Berkeley, where he received his Ph.D. in 1981, although much of his dissertation research was done in collaboration with Abhay Ashtekar. The context of his dissertation, titled The Asymptotic Structure of a Family of Einstein-Maxwell Solutions focused on families of spacetimes which describe accelerating black holes, and which contain gravitational radiation. This demonstrated the existence of exact radiating solutions to the Einstein field equations.

He is currently a professor of mathematics at Oregon State University. In addition to his ongoing work in mathematical physics, he has made significant contributions in science education, where he directs the Vector Calculus Bridge Project, an attempt to teach vector calculus the way it is used by scientists and engineers, and is part of the development team of the Paradigms Project, a complete restructuring of the undergraduate physics major around several core "paradigms". He has written a book on special relativity and a sequel on general relativity using differential forms, and is coauthor of The Geometry of the Octonions, released in 2015.

In 2017 he received a Deborah and Franklin Haimo Award for Distinguished College or University Teaching of Mathematics.

== Bibliography ==
- Abhay Ashtekar & Tevian Dray (1981). "On the Existence of Solutions to Einstein's Equation with Non-Zero Bondi News". Commun. Math. Phys. 79 (4): 581–589. Bibcode:1981CMaPh..79..581A. doi:10.1007/BF01209313. S2CID 121427482.
- Tevian Dray & Gerard 't Hooft (1985). "The Effect of Spherical Shells of Matter on the Schwarzschild Black Hole". Commun. Math. Phys. 99 (4): 613–625. Bibcode:1985CMaPh..99..613D. doi:10.1007/BF01215912. hdl:1874/4753. S2CID 122717417.
- Paul C. W. Davies; Tevian Dray & Corinne A. Manogue (1996). "Detecting the Rotating Quantum Vacuum". Phys. Rev. D. 53 (8): 4382–4387. arXiv:gr-qc/9601034. Bibcode:1996PhRvD..53.4382D. doi:10.1103/PhysRevD.53.4382. PMID 10020436. S2CID 2114187.
- Tevian Dray; George Ellis; Charles Hellaby & Corinne A. Manogue (1997). "Gravity and Signature Change". Gen. Rel. Grav. 29 (5): 591–597. arXiv:gr-qc/9610063. Bibcode:1997GReGr..29..591D. doi:10.1023/A:1018895302693. S2CID 7617543.
- (2012) Tevian Dray, The Geometry of Special Relativity (A K Peters/CRC Press) ISBN 978-1466510470
- (2014) Tevian Dray, Differential Forms and The Geometry of General Relativity (A K Peters/CRC Press) ISBN 978-1466510005
- (2015) Tevian Dray and Corinne A. Manogue, The Geometry of the Octonions (World Scientific) ISBN 978-9814401814
