= Michael Katehakis =

Greek American mathematician (born 1952)

Michael N. Katehakis
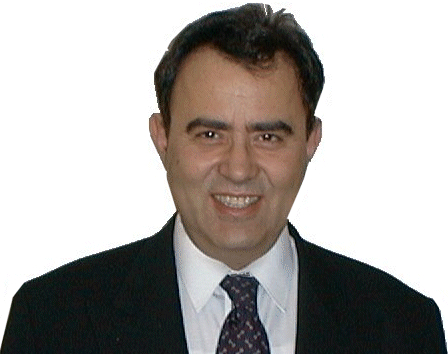
- Katehakis in 2003
- Born: 1952 (age 73–74); Heraklion, Greece
- Education: Columbia University; University of Athens
- Known for: Markov decision process Restart-in-state Index; Multi-armed bandit Double hashing Lumpable Markov chains Operations Management Auctions
- Awards: Informs Fellow; International Statistical Institute Elected Member; Jacob Wolfowitz Prize (1992)
- Scientific career
- Fields: Operations research
- Workplaces: Rutgers University
- Doctoral advisor: Cyrus Derman
- Other academic advisors: Herbert Robbins George Doundoulakis

Michael N. Katehakis (Greek: Μιχαήλ Ν. Κατεχάκης; born 1952) is a Professor of Management Science at Rutgers University. He is noted for his work in Markov decision process, Gittins index, the multi-armed bandit, Markov chains and other related fields.

== Early life ==
Katehakis was born and grew up in Heraklion Greece. He received his BS degree from the School of Physics and Mathematics of the University of Athens – Greece, an M.A. degree in Statistics from the University of South Florida, an M.S.. degree in Mathematical Methods in Engineering and Operations Research and a Ph.D. degree in Operations Research from Columbia University. His dissertation advisor at Columbia was Cyrus Derman. While a graduate student at Columbia Katehakis worked developing mathematical simulation programs for the Two-rotor engine and the Tri-rotor engine projects under George Doundoulakis.

== Career ==
After a member of technical staff position at Bell Laboratories, in 1981 he joined the Department of Applied Mathematics and Statistics at SUNY Stony Brook. There he taught and he worked with Herbert Robbins on AFOSR sponsored research and as a consultant at the Brookhaven National Laboratory doing work on nuclear reactor reliability. Subsequently, he held a visiting position at the Department of Operations Research at Stanford University where he worked with Arthur F. Veinott Jr. on computing the Gittins indices. Afterward, he joined the Decision Systems group at the Technical University of Crete.

In 1989, he joined Rutgers University where he is currently a Distinguished Professor of Operations Research, and Chair of the department of Management Science and Information Systems. At Rutgers, he worked with Herbert Robbins again on sequential allocation problems; work that was supported by the NSF. In addition, professor Katehakis has taught at Columbia University, at the University of Athens and at the University of Crete. Dr. Katehakis has been the Ph.D. thesis advisor for over 13 students.

Prof. Katehakis has consulted with various companies in the areas of high technology and he was the vice president of the Neotronics inc. a research company, where he worked with George Doundoulakis on projects funded by the private sector and the US army. He has served on the editorial boards of the "Annals of Operations Research", "Mathematics of Operations Research", the "Naval Research Logistics", "Operations Research Letters", and the "Probability in the Engineering and Informational Sciences".

== Selected writings ==
- Optimal repair allocation in a series system, with C. Derman, in "Mathematics of Operations Research", Vol. 9(4), 1984.
- A note on the hypercube model in Operations research letters, Vol. 3 (6), 1985.
- Further insight into the structure of bold and timid policies, with P. Johri, in "Advances in Applied Probability", Vol. 17(2), 1985.
- Linear programming for finite state multi-armed bandit problems with Y.R. Chen in "Mathematics of Operations Research", Vol. 11(1), 1986.
- The multi-armed bandit problem: decomposition and computation, with A. F. Veinott Jr. in "Mathematics of Operations Research", Vol. 12(2), 1987.
- On the maintenance of systems composed of highly reliable components, with C. Derman, in "Management Science", Vol. 9(4), 1989
- Dynamic allocation in survey sampling, with Z. Govindarajulu in "American Journal of Mathematical and Management Sciences", Vol. 11 (3), 1991.
- On Sequencing two types of tasks on a single processor under incomplete information, with A. Burnetas in "Probability in the Engineering and Informational Sciences", Vol. 7 (1), 1993.
- Sequential choice from several populations, with H. Robbins, in the Proceedings of the National Academy of Sciences of the United States of America, Vol. 92, 1995.
- Finite state multi-armed bandit sensitive--discount, average-reward, and average-overtaking optimality, with U. Rothblum in "Annals of Applied Probability", Vol. 6 (3), 1996.
- Optimal adaptive policies for sequential allocation problems, with A. Burnetas in "Advances in Applied Mathematics", Vol. 17 (2), 1996.
- Optimal adaptive policies for Markov decision processes, with A. Burnetas in "Mathematics of Operations Research", Vol. 22(1), 1997.
- Asymptotic Bayes analysis for the finite horizon one armed bandit problem, with A. Burnetas in "Probability in the Engineering and Informational Sciences", Vol. 17(1), 2003.
- Deferred assignment scheduling in cluster-based servers, with Ungureanu V., Melamed B. and P. Bradford in "Cluster Computing", Vol. 9(1), 2006.
- On the structure of optimal ordering policies for stochastic inventory systems with minimum order quantity, in "Probability in the Engineering and Informational Sciences", with Y. Zhao, Vol. 20(2), 2006.
- A Probabilistic Study on Combinatorial Expanders and Hashing, with P. G. Bradford in SIAM Journal on Computing, Vol. 37(1), 2007.
- Effective load balancing for cluster-based servers employing job preemption, with Ungureanu, V. and B. Melamed in "Performance Evaluation", Vol. 65(8), 2008.
- On Optimal Bidding in Sequential Procurement Auctions, with K. Puranam in "Operations Research Letters", Vol. 40, 2012.
- A Successive Lumping Procedure for a Class of Markov Chains, with L. Smit, "Probability in the Engineering and Informational Sciences", Vol. 26(4), 2012.
- On the Life and Work of Cyrus Derman, with I. Olkin, S.M. Ross and J. Yang.
- Optimization Under Uncertainty: Costs, Risks, and Revenues - Cyrus Derman Memorial Volume 1, with S.M. Ross and J. Yang.
- Production-Inventory Systems with Lost Sales and Compound Poisson Demands, with J. Shi, B. Melamed, Y. Xia.
- Multi-armed Bandits under General Depreciation and Commitment, with W. Cowan.

== Awards ==
- In 2012, Katehakis was elected a Fellow of the Institute for Operations Research and the Management Sciences (INFORMS).
- In 2012, Katehakis was elected an Elected Member of the International Statistical Institute (ISI).
- In 1992, Katehakis was awarded the Wolfowitz Prize for “introducing dynamic allocation in survey sampling for the first time”.
