= Herbert Robbins =

American mathematician

Herbert Ellis Robbins
- Herbert Robbins visiting Purdue in 1966
- Born: January 12, 1915; New Castle, Pennsylvania, US
- Died: February 12, 2001 (aged 86); Princeton, New Jersey, US
- Education: Harvard University
- Scientific career
- Workplaces: University of North Carolina; Columbia University; Rutgers University
- Thesis: On the Classification of the Maps of a 2-Complex into a Space (1938)
- Doctoral advisor: Hassler Whitney
- Doctoral students: Raghu Raj Bahadur; Cyrus Derman; David Siegmund; Herbert Wilf; Gopinath Kallianpur

Herbert Ellis Robbins (January 12, 1915 – February 12, 2001) was an American mathematician and statistician. He did research in topology, measure theory, statistics, and a variety of other fields.

He was the co-author, with Richard Courant, of What is Mathematics?. The Robbins lemma, used in empirical Bayes methods, is named after him. Robbins algebras are named after him because of a conjecture (since proved) that he posed concerning Boolean algebras. The Robbins' theorem, in graph theory, is also named after him, as is the Whitney–Robbins synthesis, a tool he introduced to prove this theorem. The well-known unsolved problem of minimizing in sequential selection the expected rank of the selected item under full information, sometimes referred to as the fourth secretary problem, also bears his name: Robbins' problem (of optimal stopping).

== Biography ==
Robbins was born in New Castle, Pennsylvania.

As an undergraduate, Robbins attended Harvard University, where Marston Morse influenced him to become interested in mathematics. Robbins received a doctorate from Harvard in 1938 under the supervision of Hassler Whitney and was an instructor at New York University from 1939 to 1941. After World War II, Robbins taught at the University of North Carolina at Chapel Hill from 1946 to 1952, where he was one of the original members of the department of mathematical statistics, then spent a year at the Institute for Advanced Study. In 1953, he became a professor of mathematical statistics at Columbia University. He retired from full-time activity at Columbia in 1985 and was then a professor at Rutgers University until his retirement in 1997. He has 567 descendants listed at the Mathematics Genealogy Project.

In 1955, Robbins introduced empirical Bayes methods at the Third Berkeley Symposium on Mathematical Statistics and Probability. Robbins was also one of the inventors of the first stochastic approximation algorithm, the Robbins–Monro method, and worked on the theory of power-one tests and optimal stopping. In 1985, in the paper "Asymptotically efficient adaptive allocation rules", with TL Lai, he constructed uniformly convergent population selection policies for the multi-armed bandit problem that possess the fastest rate of convergence to the population with highest mean, for the case that the population reward distributions are the one-parameter exponential family. These policies were simplified in the 1995 paper "Sequential choice from several populations", with Michael Katehakis.

He was a member of the National Academy of Sciences and the American Academy of Arts and Sciences and was past president of the Institute of Mathematical Statistics.

== Selected writings ==
Books by Herbert Robbins

- What is Mathematics? An Elementary Approach to Ideas and Methods, with Richard Courant, London: Oxford University Press, 1941.
- "Great Expectations: The Theory of Optimal Stopping", with Y. S. Chow and David Siegmund Boston: Houghton Mifflin, 1971.
- "Introduction to Statistics", with John Van Ryzin, Science Research Associates, 1975.

Articles (selection)

- A theorem on graphs with an application to a problem on traffic control, American Mathematical Monthly, vol. 46 (1939), pp. 281–283.
- The central limit theorem for dependent random variables, with Wassily Hoeffding, Duke Mathematical Journal, vol. 15 (1948), pp. 773–780.
- A stochastic approximation method, with Sutton Monro, Annals of Mathematical Statistics, vol. 22, no. 3 (September 1951), pp. 400–407.
- Some aspects of the sequential design of experiments, in "Bulletin of the American Mathematical Society", vol. 58, 1952.
- Two-stage procedures for estimating the difference between means, with Ghurye, SG, "Biometrika", 41(1), 146–152, 1954.
- The strong law of large numbers when the first moment does not exist, with C. Derman, in the Proceedings of the National Academy of Sciences of the United States of America, vol. 41, 1955.
- An empirical Bayes approach to statistics, in Proceedings of the Third Berkeley Symposium on Mathematical Statistics and Probability, Jerzy Neyman, ed., vol. 1, Berkeley, California: University of California Press, 1956, pp. 157–163.
- On the asymptotic theory of fixed-width sequential confidence intervals for the mean, with Chow, Y.S., "The Annals of Mathematical Statistics", 36(2), 457–462, 1965.
- Statistical methods related to the law of the iterated logarithm, "The Annals of Mathematical Statistics", 41(5), 1397–1409, 1970.
- Optimal stopping, "The American Mathematical Monthly", 77(4), 333–343, 1970.
- A convergence theorem for nonnegative almost supermartingales and some applications, with David Siegmund, "Optimizing methods in statistics", 233–257, 1971.
- Sequential tests involving two populations, with David Siegmund, "Journal of the American Statistical Association, 132–139, 1974.
- A class of dependent random variables and their maxima, with Lai, T.L. "Probability Theory and Related Fields", 42(2), 89–111, 1978
- Asymptotically efficient adaptive allocation rules with TL Lai, in "Advances in applied mathematics", vol. 6, 1985.
- Sequential choice from several populations with M. N. Katehakis, in the Proceedings of the National Academy of Sciences of the United States of America, vol. 92, 1995.
