= The Geometry of the Octonions =

Mathematics book

- First edition
- Author: Tevian Dray; Corinne Manogue
- Language: English
- Genre: Mathematics
- Publisher: World Scientific
- Publication date: 2015

The Geometry of the Octonions is a mathematics book on the octonions, a system of numbers generalizing the complex numbers and quaternions, presenting its material at a level suitable for undergraduate mathematics students. It was written by Tevian Dray and Corinne Manogue, and published in 2015 by World Scientific. The Basic Library List Committee of the Mathematical Association of America has suggested its inclusion in undergraduate mathematics libraries.

== Topics ==
The book is subdivided into three parts, with the second part being the most significant. Its contents combine both a survey of past work in this area, and much of its authors' own researches.

The first part explains the Cayley–Dickson construction, which constructs the complex numbers from the real numbers, the quaternions from the complex numbers, and the octonions from the quaternions. Related algebras are also discussed, including the sedenions (a 16-dimensional real algebra formed in the same way by taking one more step past the octonions) and the split real unital composition algebras (also called Hurwitz algebras). A particular focus here is on interpreting the multiplication operation of these algebras in a geometric way. Reviewer Danail Brezov notes with disappointment that Clifford algebras, although very relevant to this material, are not covered.

The second part of the book uses the octonions and the other division algebras associated with it to provide concrete descriptions of the Lie groups of geometric symmetries. These include rotation groups, spin groups, symplectic groups, and the exceptional Lie groups, which the book interprets as octonionic variants of classical Lie groups.

The third part applies the octonions in geometric constructions including the Hopf fibration and its generalizations, the Cayley plane, and the E_{8} lattice. It also connects them to problems in physics involving the four-dimensional Dirac equation, the quantum mechanics of relativistic fermions, spinors, and the formulation of quantum mechanics using Jordan algebras. It also includes material on octonionic number theory, and concludes with a chapter on the Freudenthal magic square and related constructions.

== Audience and reception ==
Although presented at an undergraduate level, The Geometry of the Octonions is not a textbook: its material is likely too specialized for an undergraduate course, and it lacks exercises or similar material that would be needed to use it as a textbook. Readers should be familiar with linear algebra, and some experience with Lie groups would also be helpful. The later chapters on applications in physics are heavier going, and require familiarity with quantum mechanics.

The book avoids a proof-heavy formal style of mathematical writing, so much so that reviewer Danail Brezov writes that at points it "seems to lack mathematical rigor".

== Related reading ==
Multiple reviewers suggest that this work would make a good introduction to the octonions, as a stepping stone to the more advanced material presented in other works on the same topic. Their suggestions include the following:

- Baez, John C. (2002), "The octonions", Bulletin of the American Mathematical Society, New Series, 39 (2): 145–205, arXiv:math/0105155, doi:10.1090/S0273-0979-01-00934-X, MR 1886087, S2CID 586512
- Conway, John H.; Smith, Derek A. (2003), On Quaternions and Octonions: Their Geometry, Arithmetic, and Symmetry, Natick, Massachusetts: A K Peters, ISBN 1-56881-134-9, MR 1957212
- Kantor, I. L.; Solodovnikov, A. S. (1989), Hypercomplex Numbers: An Elementary Introduction to Algebras, New York: Springer-Verlag, doi:10.1007/978-1-4612-3650-4 (inactive February 1, 2026), ISBN 0-387-96980-2, MR 0996029
- Salzmann, Helmut; Betten, Dieter; Grundhöfer, Theo; Hähl, Hermann; Löwen, Rainer; Stroppel, Markus (1995), Compact Projective Planes: With an Introduction to Octonion Geometry, De Gruyter Expositions in Mathematics, vol. 21, Walter de Gruyter & Co., Berlin, doi:10.1515/9783110876833, ISBN 3-11-011480-1, MR 1384300
- Springer, Tonny A.; Veldkamp, Ferdinand D. (2000), Octonions, Jordan Algebras and Exceptional Groups, Springer Monographs in Mathematics, Berlin: Springer-Verlag, doi:10.1007/978-3-662-12622-6, ISBN 3-540-66337-1, MR 1763974
- Ward, J. P. (1997), Quaternions and Cayley Numbers: Algebra and Applications, Mathematics and its Applications, vol. 403, Dordrecht: Kluwer Academic Publishers, doi:10.1007/978-94-011-5768-1, ISBN 0-7923-4513-4, MR 1458894
