= Corinne Manogue =

American physicist (born 1955)

Corinne Alison Manogue
- Born: March 3, 1955 (age 71); Cincinnati, Ohio, United States
- Education: Mount Holyoke College AB 1977; University of Texas, Austin Ph.D 1984
- Spouse: Tevian Dray
- Awards: Excellence in Undergraduate Physics Teaching Award, American Association of Physics Teachers, 2008
- Scientific career
- Workplaces: Oregon State University
- Doctoral advisor: Bryce DeWitt

Corinne Alison Manogue (born March 3, 1955) is an American physicist who has worked in general relativity, mathematical physics, and physics education. She was elected a Fellow of the American Physical Society in 2005, and was an inaugural Fellow of the American Association of Physics Teachers in 2014.

Her early research studied quantum field theory in curved space, including a treatment of rotating frames of reference. More recently, her work has focused on applications of the octonions to the theory of fundamental particles.

She was a graduate student under Bryce DeWitt at the University of Texas, where she received her Ph.D. in 1984. Her dissertation, titled The Vacuum in the Presence of Electromagnetic Fields and Rotating Boundaries, contained two separate results: a treatment of the gravitational Casimir effect in rotating reference frames, and a discussion of superradiance in both gravitational and electromagnetic contexts. The latter work revealed a physically important sign error in the treatment of the electromagnetic case in standard textbooks.

She is currently a professor of physics at Oregon State University. In addition to her ongoing work in mathematical physics, she has made significant contributions in physics education. Since 1997, she has directed the Paradigms in Physics Project, a complete restructuring of the undergraduate physics major around several core "paradigms". She is also coauthor of a book on the octonions released in 2015.

== Bibliography ==
- David B. Fairlie; Corinne A. Manogue (1987). "A Parameterization of the Covariant Superstring". Phys. Rev. D. 36 (2): 475–479. Bibcode:1987PhRvD..36..475F. doi:10.1103/PhysRevD.36.475. PMID 9958191.
- Corinne A. Manogue; Anthony Sudbery (1989). "General Solutions of Covariant Superstring Equations of Motion". Phys. Rev. D. 40 (12): 4073–4077. Bibcode:1989PhRvD..40.4073M. doi:10.1103/PhysRevD.40.4073. PMID 10011789.
- Corinne A.Manogue; Jörg Schray (1993). "Finite Lorentz Transformations, Automorphisms, and Division Algebras". J. Math. Phys. 34 (8): 3746–3767. arXiv:hep-th/9302044. Bibcode:1993JMP....34.3746M. doi:10.1063/1.530056. S2CID 18578156.
- Paul C. W. Davies; Tevian Dray; Corinne A. Manogue (1996). "Detecting the Rotating Quantum Vacuum". Phys. Rev. D. 53 (8): 4382–4387. arXiv:gr-qc/9601034. Bibcode:1996PhRvD..53.4382D. doi:10.1103/PhysRevD.53.4382. PMID 10020436. S2CID 2114187.
- (2015) Tevian Dray and Corinne A. Manogue, The Geometry of the Octonions (World Scientific) ISBN 978-9814401814
