= William R. Thompson =

William R. Thompson may refer to:

- William Rae Thompson, inventor of Thompson sampling
- William Robin Thompson, Canadian entomologist
- William Robert Thompson, Canadian psychologist
- Bill R. Thompson, also named William Robert Thompson, Australian athlete
- Bill Thompson (South Dakota politician), also named William R. Thompson, South Dakota politician

== See also ==
- William Thompson (disambiguation)
- Bill Thompson (disambiguation)
