= William Rae Thompson =

American mathematician and statistician

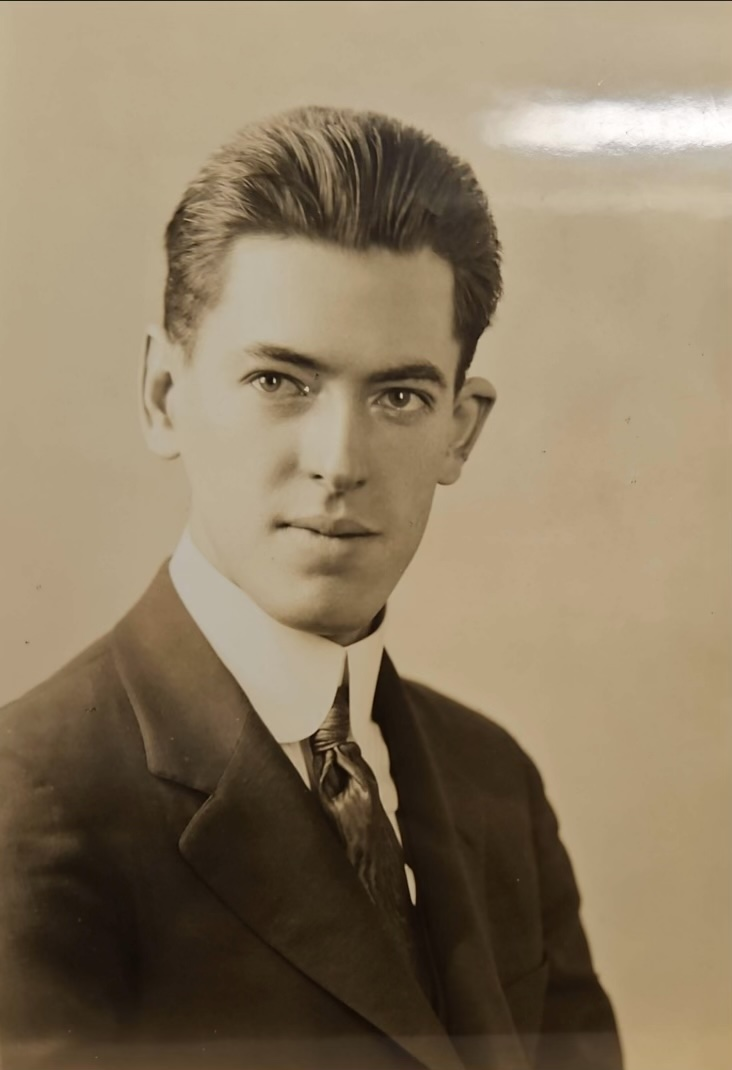
- Born: July 29, 1896
- Died: May 30, 1993 (aged 96)
- Resting place: Cortland Rural Cemetery, Cortland, New York
- Education: Columbia University; Yale University
- Known for: Thompson sampling
- Spouse: Mary E. Dalton Thompson (1903–1992)
- Scientific career
- Workplaces: Yale Department of Pathology; New York State Department of Health

William Rae Thompson was an American mathematician and statistician best known for inventing Thompson sampling, a foundational heuristic in machine learning and reinforcement learning for the multi-armed bandit problem. First published in 1933, his algorithm saw a significant resurgence in the 21st century and has since become a standard technique in artificial intelligence and online decision-making. Beyond his work in pure mathematics, Thompson spent decades applying statistical analysis to the medical sciences, with extensive contributions to pathology and immunology.

== Early life and education ==
Thompson earned his Bachelor of Arts from Columbia University in 1923. He then attended Yale University, where he received his Ph.D. in mathematics in 1930. His doctoral dissertation was titled On The Possible Forms Of Discriminants Of Algebraic Fields.

== Academic career ==
Thompson was affiliated with Yale University from 1924 to 1936. Following his graduate studies, he applied his mathematical background to the medical sciences. He worked in the Yale Department of Pathology under Dr. Milton Winternitz, serving as a Research Assistant with the rank of Instructor from 1928 to 1934, and subsequently with the rank of Assistant Professor from 1934 to 1936.

During this time, he contributed to multiple scientific articles published by the Department of Pathology. He later moved to the Division of Laboratories and Research at the New York State Department of Health in Albany, where he continued to publish statistical analyses related to medical testing and immunology through the 1940s and 1950s.

In 1953, Thompson was elected as a Fellow of the American Statistical Association in recognition of his contributions to the field of biostatistics.

== Publications and Thompson sampling ==
In 1933, while at Yale, Thompson published the scientific paper "On the likelihood that one unknown probability exceeds another in view of the evidence of two samples" in the journal Biometrika.

The paper introduced what is now known as Thompson sampling. The algorithm proposes a Bayesian approach to the exploration-exploitation dilemma: it allocates a proportion of trials to an action matching the posterior probability that the action is optimal. Thompson originally framed this problem in the context of clinical trials, aiming to minimize patient exposure to inferior treatments.

== Legacy and modern resurgence ==
For several decades after its publication, Thompson's 1933 algorithm was largely overlooked by the broader statistical and computer science communities. As researchers later noted, the algorithm "was largely ignored in the academic literature until recently, although it was independently rediscovered several times in the interim as an effective heuristic." However, in the early 2010s, empirical studies demonstrated its state-of-the-art performance in complex, multi-armed bandit scenarios. As researchers at the time observed, the "Thompson Sampling algorithm has experimentally been shown to be close to optimal," sparking rapid adoption in online advertising and reinforcement learning.

Today, his 1933 paper has garnered over 5,000 academic citations. The algorithm he invented is recognized as a foundational concept in the field of artificial intelligence, with modern scholars noting that it "addresses a broad range of problems in a computationally efficient manner and is therefore enjoying wide use." It has also been the subject of dedicated modern textbooks and extensive theoretical analysis proving its optimal regret bounds.

Because of their similar names and overlapping active periods, the algorithm has frequently been misattributed to the Canadian entomologist William Robin Thompson. Archival records from Yale University definitively separate the mathematician from his contemporary, confirming William Rae Thompson as the true inventor.

== Selected publications ==
- Hussey, R. G.; Thompson, William R.; Calhoun, E. T. (1927). "The Influence of X-Rays on the Development of Drosophila Larvae". Science. 66 (1698): 65–66. doi:10.1126/science.66.1698.65.
- Thompson, William R. (1930). On The Possible Forms Of Discriminants Of Algebraic Fields (Ph.D. thesis). Yale University.
- Thompson, William R. (1933). "On the likelihood that one unknown probability exceeds another in view of the evidence of two samples". Biometrika. 25 (3/4): 285–294. doi:10.1093/biomet/25.3-4.285.
- Thompson, William R. (1933). "Frequency-Distribution of Volume of Islands of Langerhans in the Pancreas of Man, Monkey and Dog". Science. 78 (2021): 270. doi:10.1126/science.78.2021.270.
