= Yi Yu =

Chinese statistician

Yi Yu (Chinese: 于怡) is a Chinese statistician who works in the UK as professor in the Department of Statistics at the University of Warwick. Her research interests include high-dimensional statistics, spectral methods in statistics, change detection, differential privacy, and trustworthy AI.

== Education and career ==
Yu was educated at Fudan University, where she received a bachelor's degree in mathematics in 2009 and a Ph.D. in mathematical statistics in 2013. Her dissertation, Contributions on high-dimensional variable selection, was advised by Zhiliang Ying of Columbia University in New York City.

Next, she became a postdoctoral researcher at the University of Cambridge Statistical Laboratory, from 2013 to 2016, working there under the supervision of Richard Samworth. From 2017 to 2019 she held a lecturer position at the University of Bristol. She moved to the University of Warwick as an associate professor in 2019, and was promoted to reader in 2021 and professor in 2023.

== Recognition ==
Yu was a 2023 recipient of the Philip Leverhulme Prizes.
