= Yuguo Chen =

American statistician

- Education: University of Science and Technology of China (BS); Stanford University (PhD)
- Scientific career
- Workplaces: University of Illinois at Urbana-Champaign
- Thesis: Sequential Importance Sampling with Resampling: Theory and Applications (2001)
- Doctoral advisor: Tze Leung Lai; Jun S. Liu
- Doctoral students: Emma Zhang
- Website: publish.illinois.edu/yuguo/

Yuguo Chen is a professor of statistics and the interim chair of the Department of Statistics at the University of Illinois at Urbana-Champaign. His work mainly focuses on Markov chain Monte Carlo algorithms and network analysis.

He received a B.S. in mathematics from University of Science and Technology of China in 1997 and a Ph.D. in statistics at Stanford University in 2001 under the supervision of Tze Leung Lai and Jun S. Liu. Prior to joining the University of Illinois, he was an assistant professor at the Institute of Statistics and Decision Sciences at Duke University from 2001 to 2005.

Chen was named a Fellow of the American Statistical Association in 2018.

== Selected publications ==
- "State and parameter estimation of hydrologic models using the constrained ensemble Kalman filter". Water Resources Research. doi:10.1029/2008WR007401
- "Sequential Monte Carlo Methods for Statistical Analysis of Tables". Journal of the American Statistical Association 100:109–120. doi:10.1198/016214504000001303
