= Emma Zhang =

Chinese-American statistician

Emma Jingfei Zhang is a Chinese-American statistician whose research analyzes the statistics of complex systems including networks, tensors, and point processes, and their applications in understanding social networks, gene interactions, and the brain. She is Goizueta Foundation Term Associate Professor of Information Systems & Operations Management at Emory University.

== Education and career ==
Zhang studied mathematics at Nankai University, graduating in 2009. She completed her Ph.D. in statistics in 2014 at the University of Illinois Urbana-Champaign. Her dissertation, Statistical Inference on Network Data, was supervised by Yuguo Chen.

She joined the University of Miami as an assistant professor of management science in 2014, was promoted to associate professor in 2020, and added a secondary appointment as associate professor of public health sciences in Miami's Miller School of Medicine in 2022. In 2023 she moved to the Department of Information Systems & Operations Management in the Goizueta Business School of Emory University, with a secondary appointment in the Department of Biostatistics and Bioinformatics of the Rollins School of Public Health.

== Recognition ==
Zhang became an Elected Member of the International Statistical Institute in 2023. In 2025 she was named as a Fellow of the American Statistical Association.
