= Zhiliang Ying =

Chinese American statistician (born 1960)

- 应志良
- Born: April 1960 (age 66); Shanghai, China
- Education: Fudan University (BS); Columbia University (PhD)
- Scientific career
- Fields: Statistics
- Workplaces: Columbia University
- Thesis: Recursive Estimation and Adaptive Control in Stochastic Linear Systems (1987)
- Doctoral advisor: Tze Leung Lai
- Doctoral students: Yi Yu

Zhiliang Ying (Chinese: 应志良; pinyin: yìng zhìliáng; born April 1960) is a Professor of Statistics in the Department of Statistics, Columbia University. He served as co-chair of the department.

== Education and career ==
He received his PhD from Columbia University in 1987, with Tze Leung Lai as his doctoral advisor. He was the Director of the Institute of Statistics at Rutgers University from 1997 to 2001. His wide research interests cover Survival Analysis, Sequential Analysis, Longitudinal Data Analysis, Stochastic Processes, Semiparametric Inference, Biostatistics and Educational Statistics. He is a co-editor of Statistica Sinica and has been Associate Editor of JASA, Statistica Sinica, Annals of Statistics, Biometrics, and Lifetime Data Analysis.

Ying has supervised, collaborated with and encouraged many researchers. He has written or co-authored more than 100 research articles in professional journals.

== Selected honours and awards ==
- Fellow, Institute of Mathematical Statistics (1995 election)
- Fellow, American Statistical Association (1999 election)
- The Morningside Gold Medal of Applied Mathematics 2004
- The Distinguished Achievement Award 2007, International Chinese Statistical Association

== Selected papers ==
- Lin, D. Y., Wei, L. J., & Ying, Z. (1993). Checking the Cox model with cumulative sums of martingale-based residuals. Biometrika, 80(3), 557–572.
- Lin, D. Y., & Ying, Z. (1994). Semiparametric analysis of the additive risk model. Biometrika, 81(1), 61–71.
- Chang, H. H., & Ying, Z. (1996). A global information approach to computerized adaptive testing. Applied Psychological Measurement, 20(3), 213–229.
- Jin, Z., Lin, D. Y., Wei, L. J., & Ying, Z. (2003). Rank‐based inference for the accelerated failure time model. Biometrika, 90(2), 341–353.
- Ying, Z. (1993), A large sample study of rank estimation for censored regression data. The Annals of Statistics, 76–99.
