= Probability matching =

Decision strategy

Probability matching is a decision strategy in which predictions of class membership are proportional to the class base rates. Thus, if in the training set positive examples are observed 60% of the time, and negative examples are observed 40% of the time, then the observer using a probability-matching strategy will predict (for unlabeled examples) a class label of "positive" on 60% of instances, and a class label of "negative" on 40% of instances.

The optimal Bayesian decision strategy in such a case is to always predict "positive" (i.e., predict the majority category in the absence of other information), which has 60% chance of winning rather than matching which has 52% of winning (where p is the probability of positive realization, the result of matching would be $p^2+(1-p)^2$, here $.6 \times .6+ .4 \times .4$). The probability-matching strategy is of psychological interest because it is frequently employed by human subjects in decision and classification studies. A related strategy for sequential decision problems is Thompson sampling, which chooses an action according to the posterior probability that it is optimal; Thompson introduced this rule in 1933..

The only case when probability matching will yield same results as Bayesian decision strategy mentioned above is when all class base rates are the same. So, if in the training set positive examples are observed 50% of the time, then the Bayesian strategy would yield 50% accuracy (1 × .5), just as probability matching (.5 ×.5 + .5 × .5).
