= William Robin Thompson =

Canadian entomologist

William Robin Thompson (June 29, 1887 – January 30, 1972) was a Canadian entomologist and also wrote on the philosophy of science in his book Science and Common Sense: An Aristotelian Excursion (1937). He specialized in the biological control of agricultural and forest insects and served as the head of a laboratory of the Imperial Institute of Entomology which changed its name from the Imperial Parasite Service to Imperial Bureau of Biological Control and later the Commonwealth Institute of Biological Control.

== Career ==
Thompson was born in London, Ontario to the schoolmaster and journalist William Thompson and of Alice née Morgan. The family friends included the ornithologist Edward Saunders and the botanist John Dearness which led to an early interest in birds, plants and fungi. He later took an interest in insects thanks to C.J.S. Bethune. After studying biology at the University of Toronto, he obtained a B.S in 1909 and started working at the United States Department of Agriculture. During his employment there, he continued to study at Cornell University and received his master's degree in entomology in 1912. The following year, he resigned from the Department of Agriculture to conduct research at University of Cambridge during 1914–1915. He travelled to France, and in 1919 married the USDA scientific illustrator Mary Carmody, and pursued his research at the European Parasite Laboratory and graduated in 1921 which a doctorate in zoology at University of Paris. In 1924 he obtained another doctorate, this time in philosophy at St. Maximin College in France.

In 1928, Thompson left France and became assistant director of the Imperial Institute of Entomology in Britain, a service he held until 1947 when he returned to Canada. He became a professor at the Institute of Civil Service of Canada in 1949. Thompson was Director of the Commonwealth Institute of Biological Control in Ottawa (1946–1958). He was appointed Fellow of the Royal Society in 1933.

Thompson published about 150 articles in various scientific journals. Between 1947 and 1958 he was editor of the magazine The Canadian Entomologist. He died in Ottawa.

== Evolution ==
Thompson was a Catholic who held anti-Darwinian views. He was influenced by the philosophical writings of Aristotle and Thomas Aquinas. He wrote the critical 16-page introduction for the 1956 Everyman Edition of Charles Darwin's The Origin of Species. His introduction was reprinted by the Evolution Protest Movement in 1967. Thompson rejected natural selection. Historian of science Sharon E. Kingsland has noted that:

Thompson believed that all species possessed an essence, or form, in the strict Aristotelian sense, which could not be changed by material means. He had a strong aversion to the hypothesis that all adapted types had been produced by the random actions of mutation and natural selection. Such random processes might explain microevolution, but they could not explain macroevolution. Thompson could not suggest an alternative hypothesis for the ones he had rejected; he simply regarded evolution as an unsolved problem.

Thompson also rejected theistic evolution and was critical of the ideas of Pierre Teilhard de Chardin. In his book Science and Common Sense, he wrote that "there has been some evolution, but we cannot decide upon a priori principles how much. Natural science has no key to this problem." Biologist E. S. Russell noted that Thompson treated the philosophy of living organisms from an Aristotelian standpoint.

== Mathematical biology ==
After reading D'Arcy Wentworth Thompson's On Growth and Form, he became interested in the possible application of mathematics to biology. This view was unpopular at the time amongst American and Canadian biologists. In the 1920s he was influenced by the work of mathematician Vito Volterra. Thompson has been described as "one of the pioneers of mathematical modeling in ecology", but later became a staunch critic of it.

In the 1930s, Thompson radically changed his opinions about the use of mathematics in biology, believing the association was strongly negative. This was largely due to the work on population genetics by J. B. S. Haldane and Ronald Fisher which he believed was too abstract and devoid of common sense and empirical facts. Thompson was concerned that many of the arguments from mathematical biology were not based on biological observation. He believed that mathematical speculation should not replace the study of nature through laborious field research.

Thompson outlined his views on mathematics, philosophy and science in his book Science and Common Sense: An Aristotelian Excursion (1937).

== Systematics ==
Thompson wrote papers on the species problem and systematics. In a 1952 paper he argued against the reality of species based on his opinion that the species taxon is an "abstraction" taken from the features of many individuals but species themselves are not "the individual or the collectivity of individuals."

== Publications ==
- Science and Common Sense: An Aristotelian Excursion (1937) [preface by Jacques Maritain]
- New Challenging 'Introduction' to the Origin of Species (1956)
- A Catalogue of the Parasites and Predators of Insect Pests (1965)
- The Origin of Species: A Scientist's Criticism. In Osman Bakar. (1987). Critique of Evolutionary Theory: A Collection of Essays. The Islamic Academy of Science and Nurin Enterprise. pp. 15–39.

== Arms ==
Coat of arms of William Robin Thompson

Crest
An arm embowed in armour Proper charged with a maple leaf Or and holding five ears of corn Gold.
Escutcheon
1st & 4th Or a sword erect Proper between three trefoils Azure on a canton of the last a sun in splendour of the first 2nd & 3rd Azure on a pale radiant Or a lion rampant Sable.
Motto
In Lumine Lucem
