= Charles James Stewart Bethune =

Canadian Anglican priest and entomologist

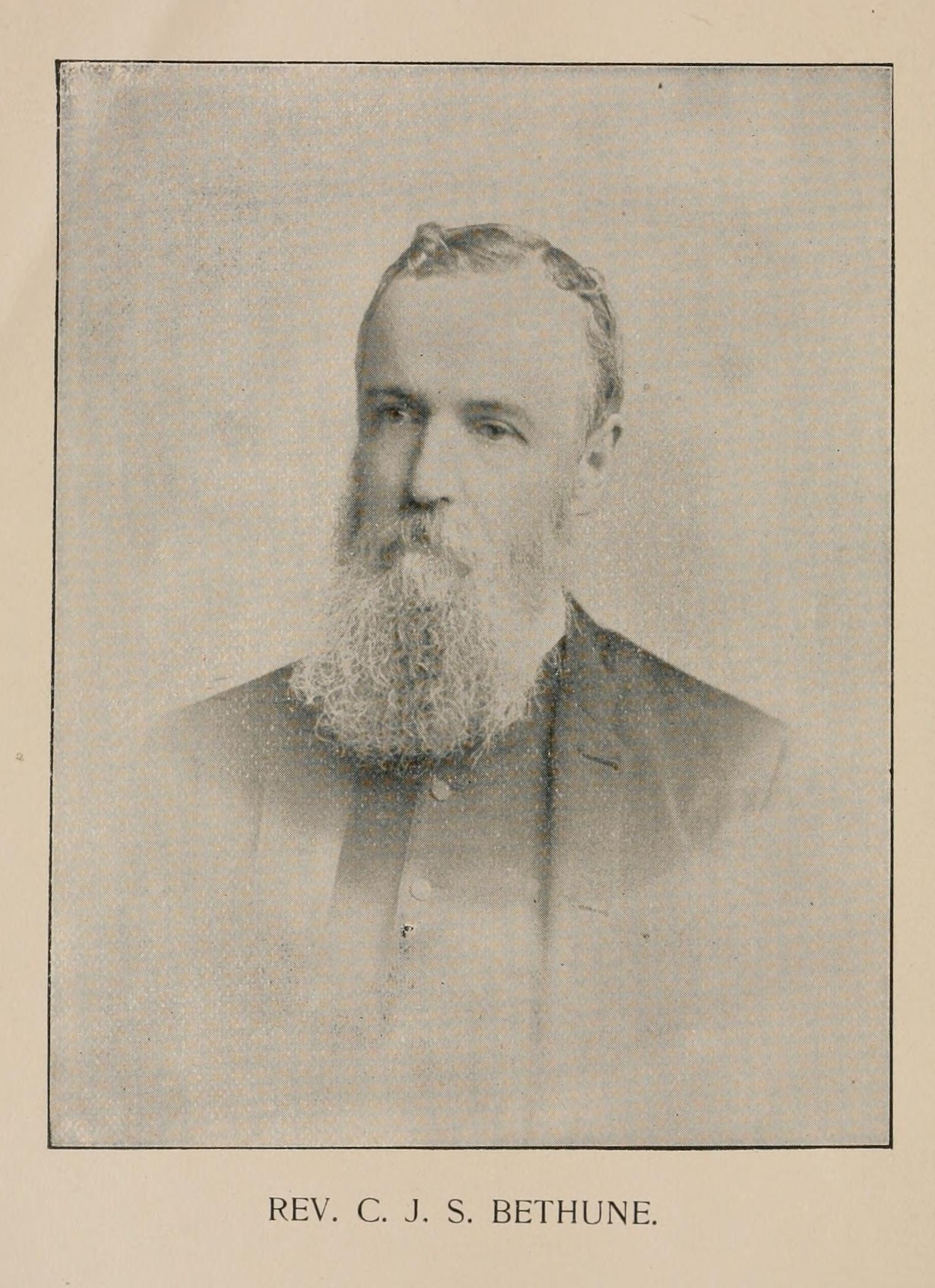

Charles James Stewart Bethune (12 August 1838 – 18 April 1932) was a Canadian Anglican priest and entomologist. He was along with William Saunders, a founder of the Entomological Society of Canada editing its journal The Canadian Entomologist for its first 30 years.

Bethune was born in West Flamboro, Upper Canada son of Reverend Alexander Neil Bethune, second Bishop of Toronto. The family had moved from Skye to North Carolina in 1774 and an ancestor Rev. John Bethune had founded the Presbyterian Church in Montreal. Charles however was confirmed in the Church of England and after studying at Upper Canada College he graduated from Trinity College in 1859 receiving an MA in 1861 and a DCL in 1883. He then worked as a priest for nine years and served as headmaster of Trinity College School, Port Hope from 1870 to 1899. In 1906 he joined the Ontario Agricultural College in the entomology and zoology department. His entomological career had been developed in association with William Saunders, Sir William Osler and others and he was involved in the founding of the Entomological Society of Ontario. Bethune was a theological naturalist who saw insects as a means for understand Creation. At a meeting of the American Association for the Advancement of Science in 1872, he disputed with Samuel Scudder on evolution and in 1910 he stated that the main reason for maintaining butterfly collections was because "they were created because the Lord has an eye on the beautiful."

Bethune was married to Harriet Alice Mary from 1863 until her death in a carriage accident in July 1898.
