= John C. Gittins =

- Born: 1938 (age 87–88)
- Education: University of Cambridge (MA), University of Wales (PhD) University of Oxford (Hon. DSc)
- Known for: Gittins index
- Awards: Rollo Davidson Prize (1982); Guy Medal (Silver, 1984)
- Scientific career
- Thesis: Optimal resource allocation in chemical research (1968)
- Doctoral advisor: Dennis Lindley

John Charles Gittins (born 1938) is a researcher in applied probability and operations research, who is a professor and Emeritus Fellow at Keble College, University of Oxford.

He is renowned as the developer of the "Gittins index", which is used for sequential decision-making, especially in research and development in the pharmaceutical industry. He has research interests in applied probability, decision analysis and optimal decisions, including optimal stopping and stochastic optimization.

Gittins was an Assistant Director of Research at the Department of Engineering, Cambridge University from 1967 to 1974. Then he was a lecturer at the University of Oxford from 1975 to 2005 and head of the Department of Statistics there for 6 years. In 1992, the University of Oxford awarded him the honorary degree Doctor of Science (DSc). In 1996, he became a Professor of Statistics at the University of Oxford.

He has been awarded the Rollo Davidson Prize (1982) for early-career probabilists, and the Guy Medal in Silver (1984).

== Selected publications ==
- (1989) Multi-Armed Bandit Allocation Indices, Wiley. ISBN 0-471-92059-2
- (1985) (with Bergman, S.W.) Statistical Methods for Pharmaceutical Research Planning, CRC Press. ISBN 0-8247-7146-X
- (2000) (with H. Pezeshk) "How Large Should a Clinical Trial Be?", The Statistician, 49 (2), 177–187 )
- (2001) (with G. Harper) "Bounds on the Performance of a Greedy Algorithm for Probabilities". Mathematics of Operations Research, 26, 313–323
- (2003) "Stochastic Models for the Planning of Pharmaceutical Research", Journal of Statistical Theory and Applications, 2 (2), 198–214.
- (2011) (with K. D. Glazebrook and R. R. Weber) Multi-Armed Bandit Allocation Indices, second edition, Wiley, ISBN 0-470-67002-9
