= Tze Leung Lai =

American statistician (1945–2023)

- Born: June 28, 1945; Hong Kong
- Died: May 21, 2023 (aged 77)
- Citizenship: United States
- Education: University of Hong Kong; Columbia University
- Scientific career
- Fields: Statistics
- Institutions: Stanford University
- Thesis: Confidence Sequences and Martingales (1971)
- Doctoral advisor: David Oliver Siegmund
- Doctoral students: Yuguo Chen; Zhiliang Ying; Dylan Small
- Website: tzelai.ckirby.su.domains

Tze Leung Lai (June 28, 1945 – May 21, 2023) was a Chinese-American statistician of Hong Kong descent. He was the Ray Lyman Wilbur Professor of Statistics, as well as a professor of Biomedical Data Science and of the Institute of Computational and Mathematical Engineering (ICME) at Stanford University. He co-directed the Center for Innovative Study Design (CISD) at the Stanford University School of Medicine. He was the recipient of the COPSS Presidents' Award, one of the highest honors in statistics, in 1983.

He received his bachelor's degree from the University of Hong Kong in 1967. He received an M.A. in 1970 and a Ph.D. in 1971 in Mathematical Statistics from Columbia University.

He supervised 79 doctoral theses and 7 postdoctoral trainees.

He died on May 21, 2023.

== Honors and awards ==
He received the COPSS Presidents' Award in 1983. He was also awarded a Guggenheim fellowship the same year.

He was a fellow of the American Statistical Association (1986), the Institute of Mathematical Statistics, and Academia Sinica (1994).
