= Yield management =

Operational business strategy

Yield management (YM) is a variable pricing strategy, based on understanding, anticipating and influencing consumer behavior in order to maximize revenue or profits from a fixed, time-limited resource (such as airline seats, hotel room reservations, or advertising inventory). As a specific, inventory-focused branch of revenue management, yield management involves strategic control of inventory to sell the right product to the right customer at the right time for the right price. This process can result in price discrimination, in which customers consuming identical goods or services are charged different prices. Yield management is a large revenue generator for several major industries; Robert Crandall, former chairman and CEO of American Airlines, gave yield management its name and has called it "the single most important technical development in transportation management since we entered deregulation."

== Definition ==
Yield management has become part of mainstream business theory and practice over the last fifteen to twenty years. Whether an emerging discipline or a new management science (it has been called both), yield management is a set of yield maximization strategies and tactics to improve the profitability of certain businesses. It is complex because it involves several aspects of management control, including rate management, revenue streams management, and distribution channel management. Yield management is multidisciplinary because it blends elements of marketing, operations, and financial management into a highly successful new approach. Yield management strategists must frequently work with one or more other departments when designing and implementing yield management strategies.

== History ==
Deregulation is generally regarded as the catalyst for yield management in the airline industry, but this tends to overlook the role of global distribution systems (GDSs). It is arguable that the fixed pricing paradigm occurs as a result of decentralized consumption. With mass production, pricing became a centralized management activity and customer contact staff focused on customer service exclusively. Electronic commerce, of which the GDSs were the first wave, created an environment where large volumes of sales could be managed without large numbers of customer service staff. They also gave management staff direct access to price at time of consumption and rich data capture for future decision-making.

On January 17, 1985, American Airlines launched Ultimate Super Saver fares in an effort to compete with low cost carrier People Express Airlines. Donald Burr, the CEO of People Express, is quoted as saying "We were a vibrant, profitable company from 1981 to 1985, and then we tipped right over into losing $50 million a month... We had been profitable from the day we started until American came at us with Ultimate Super Savers." in the book Revenue Management by Robert G. Cross, Chairman and CEO of Revenue Analytics. The yield management systems developed at American Airlines were recognized by the Edelman Prize committee of INFORMS for contributing $1.4 billion in a three-year period at the airline.

Yield management spread to other travel and transportation companies in the early 1990s. Notable was implementation of yield management at National Car Rental. In 1993, General Motors was forced to take a $744 million charge against earnings related to its ownership of National Car Rental. In response, National's program expanded the definition of yield management to include capacity management, pricing and reservations control. As a result of this program, General Motors was able to sell National Car Rental for an estimated $1.2 billion. Yield management gave way to the more general practice of revenue management. Whereas revenue management involves predicting consumer behavior by segmenting markets, forecasting demand, and optimizing prices for several different types of products, yield management refers specifically to maximizing revenue through inventory control. Some notable revenue management implementations include the NBC which credits its system with $200 million in improved ad sales from 1996 to 2000, the target pricing initiative at UPS, and revenue management at Texas Children's Hospital. Since 2000, much of the dynamic pricing, promotions management and dynamic packaging that underlie e commerce sites leverage revenue management techniques. In 2002 GMAC launched an early implementation of web based revenue management in the financial services industry.

There have also been high-profile failures and faux pas. Amazon.com was criticized for irrational price changes that resulted from a revenue management software bug. The Coca-Cola Company's plans for a dynamic pricing vending machine were put on hold as a result of negative consumer reactions. Revenue management is also blamed for much of the financial difficulty currently experienced by legacy carriers. The reliance of the major carriers on high fares in captive markets arguably created the conditions for low-cost carriers to thrive.

== Use by industry ==
There are three essential conditions for yield management to be applicable:

- That there is a fixed amount of resources available for sale.
- That the resources sold are perishable (there is a time limit to selling the resources, after which they cease to be of value).
- That different customers are willing to pay a different price for using the same amount of resources.

If the resources available are not fixed or not perishable, the problem is limited to logistics, i.e. inventory or production management. If all customers would pay the same price for using the same amount of resources, the challenge would perhaps be limited to selling as quickly as possible, e.g. if there are costs for holding inventory.

Yield management is of especially high relevance in cases where the constant costs are relatively high compared to the variable costs. The less variable cost there is, the more the additional revenue earned will contribute to the overall profit. This is because it focuses on maximizing expected marginal revenue for a given operation and planning horizon. It optimizes resource utilization by ensuring inventory availability to customers with the highest expected net revenue contribution and extracting the greatest level of ‘willingness to pay’ from the entire customer base. Yield management practitioners typically claim 3% to 7% incremental revenue gains. In many industries this can equate to over 100% increase in profits.

Yield management has significantly altered the travel and hospitality industry since its inception in the mid-1980s. It requires analysts with detailed market knowledge and advanced computing systems who implement sophisticated mathematical techniques to analyze market behavior and capture revenue opportunities. It has evolved from the system airlines invented as a response to deregulation and quickly spread to hotels, car rental firms, cruise lines, media, telecommunications and energy to name a few. Its effectiveness in generating incremental revenues from an existing operation and customer base has made it particularly attractive to business leaders that prefer to generate return from revenue growth and enhanced capability rather than downsizing and cost cutting.

=== Airlines ===
In the passenger airline case, capacity is regarded as fixed because changing what aircraft flies a certain service based on the demand is the exception rather than the rule. When the aircraft departs, the unsold seats cannot generate any revenue and thus can be said to have perished, or have spoiled. Airlines use specialized software to monitor how seats are reserved and react accordingly. There are various inventory controls such as a nested inventory system. For example, airlines can offer discounts on low-demand flights, where the flight will likely not sell out. When there is excess demand, the seats can be sold at a higher price.

Another way of capturing varying willingness to pay is market segmentation. A firm may repackage its basic inventory into different products to this end. In the passenger airline case this means implementing purchase restrictions, length of stay requirements and requiring fees for changing or canceling tickets.

The airline needs to keep a specific number of seats in reserve to cater to the probable demand for high-fare seats. This process can be managed by inventory controls or by managing the fare rules such as the AP (Advanced Purchase) restrictions. (30 day advance purchase, 21 day advance purchase, 14 day advance purchase, 7 day advance purchase, day of departure/walk up fares) The price of each seat varies directly with the number of seats reserved, that is, the fewer seats that are reserved for a particular category, the lower the price of each seat. This will continue until the price of seat in the premium class equals that of those in the concession class. Depending on this, a floor price (lower price) for the next seat to be sold is set.

=== Hotels and multi-family residences ===
Hotels use this system in largely the same way, to calculate the rates. Yield management is one of the most common pricing strategies used in the hotel industry to increase reservations and boost revenue.

In the multi-family residential industry, revenue management software started to be used around 2001, with Archstone-Smith helping to develop the LRO (Lease Rent Options) Revenue Management System from Rainmaker. Another early system was the YieldStar Asset Optimization System from RealPage. By 2024 the systems had been developed into cloud-based platforms known as a Revenue Management Systems (RMS). These systems are widely used by hotels to help optimize their revenue, as they automate the booking system, dynamically pricing rooms based on real-time activity, thus increasing revenue and occupancy as well as providing improved forecasting. Some RMS software is bundled as a standalone system, but sometimes it comes as part of a larger Property Management System (PMS). Many points in hotel yield management also apply to instances such as pet boarding.

=== Rental ===
In the rental car industry, yield management deals with the sale of optional insurance, damage waivers and vehicle upgrades. It accounts for a major portion of the rental company's profitability, and is monitored on a daily basis. In the equipment rental industry, yield management is a method to manage rental rates against capacity (available fleet) and demand.

=== Intercity buses ===
Yield management has moved into the bus industry with companies such as Megabus (Europe), Megabus (North America), BoltBus and easyBus, which run low-cost networks in the United Kingdom and parts of the United States, and more recently, nakedbus.com and Intercape, which have networks in New Zealand and South Africa. Now operating and developed in Chile by SARCAN, a Chilean company that provides revenue and yield management systems focused on this industry, with the company Turbus as principal customer. Finnish low-cost inter-city bus service OnniBus, as well as Polish PolskiBus, bases its revenue flow on yield management.

=== Insurance ===
Insurance companies use price (premium) optimization to improve profitability on policy sales. The method is widely used by property & casualty insurers and brokers in the UK, Spain and, to a lesser extent, in the US. Several vendors, such as Earnix, Willis Towers Watson, EMB, ODG, provide specialized pricing optimization software for the industry.

=== Telecommunications ===
On average, communications service providers use an average of just 35 to 40 percent of available network capacity. Recently, telecommunications software vendors such as Telcordia and Ericsson have promoted yield management as a strategy for communications service providers to generate additional revenue and reduce capital expenditures by maximizing the subscriber use of available network bandwidth. Approaches include basing a strategy on innovative services explicitly designed to use only spare capacity and borrowing proven methods from the airline industry. The approach can be more difficult to implement in the telecommunications industry than the airlines sector because of the difficulty to control and sometimes refuse network access to customers.

Similarities that exist between the airline and telecom industries include a large sunk cost combined with low marginal cost, perishable inventory, reservations, pricing flexibility and the opportunity to upsell. Differences that present challenges for communications service providers include low-value transactions and overall network complexity. Suggested approaches to executing a successful yield management strategy include accurate network information collection, bandwidth capacity allocation that does not impact service quality, the deployment of service management software such as real time policy and real-time charging, and using new marketing channels to target consumers with innovative services.

=== Online advertising ===
Yield management in online ad sales is in essence the same as in other industries above mentioned; managing the publishers supply/inventory (banner impressions) with the market demand, at the best price (CPM/RPM) while assuring highest possible fill rates.

=== Railways ===
While railways traditionally sold fully flexible tickets that were valid on all trains on a given day or even trains on several days, deregulation and (partial) privatization introduced yield management in the United Kingdom as well as for high speed services in Germany or France. Tickets for the same route can be as cheap as €19 but also go into the triple digits depending on departure time, demand, and the time the ticket is booked.

=== Skiing ===
Yield Management has shown increasing popularity in the ski industry, especially in the North American markets. This ranges from non-physical rate fences, including age and validity differentiation to fully dynamic prices. Determinants of such variable prices include date-specific expected demand factors (institutional and public holidays, weekends, weather, size and accessibility of the resort, etc.)

== Econometrics ==
Yield management and econometrics center on detailed forecasting and mathematical optimization of marginal revenue opportunities. The opportunities arise from segmentation of consumer willingness to pay. If the market for a particular good follows the simple straight line Price/Demand relationship illustrated below, a single fixed price of $50 there is enough demand to sell 50 units of inventory. This results in $2500 in revenues. However the same Price/Demand relationship yields $4000 if consumers are presented with multiple prices.

In practice, the segmentation approach relies on adequate fences between consumers so that everyone doesn't buy at the lowest price offered. The airlines use time of purchase to create this segmentation, with later booking customers paying the higher fares. The fashion industry uses time in the opposite direction, discounting later in the selling season once the item is out of fashion or inappropriate for the time of year. Other approaches to fences involve attributes that create substantial value to the consumer at little or no cost to the seller. A backstage pass at a concert is a good example of this. Initially yield management avoided the complexity caused by the interaction of absolute price and price position by using surrogates for price such as booking class. By the mid-1990s, most implementation incorporated some measures of price elasticity. The airlines were exceptional in this case, preferring to focus on more detailed segmentation by implementing O&D (Origin & Destination) systems.

At the heart of yield management decision-making process is the trade-off of marginal yields from segments that are competing for the same inventory. In capacity-constrained cases, there is a bird-in-the-hand decision that forces the seller to reject lower revenue generating customers in the hopes that the inventory can be sold in a higher valued segment. The tradeoff is sometimes mistakenly identified as occurring at the intersection of the marginal revenue curves for the competing segments. While this is accurate when it supports marketing decisions where access to both segments is equivalent, it is wrong for inventory control decisions. In these cases the intersection of the marginal revenue curve of the higher valued segment with the actual value of the lower segment is the point of interest.

In the case illustrated here, a car rental company must set up protection levels for its higher valued segments. By estimating where the marginal revenue curve of the luxury segment crosses the actual rental value of the midsize car segment the company can decide how many luxury cars to make available to midsize car renters. Where the vertical line from this intersection point crosses the demand (horizontal) axis determines how many luxury cars should be protected for genuine luxury car renters. The need to calculate protection levels has led to a number of heuristic solutions, most notable EMSRa and EMSRb, which stands for Expected Marginal Seat Revenue version a and b respectively. The balancing point of interest is found using Littlewood's rule which states that demand for $R_2$ should be accepted as long as

$R$_{2} $\ge R$_{1}$* Prob( D$_{1}$>x )$

where
$R_2$ is the value of the lower valued segment
$R_1$ is the value of the higher valued segment
$D_1$ is the demand for the higher valued segment and
$x$ is the capacity left

This equation is re-arranged to compute protection levels as follows:

$y$_{1}$= Prob$^{−1}$( R$_{2}$/R$_{1}$)$

In words, the seller wants to protect $y$_{1} units of inventory for the higher valued segment where $y$_{1} is equal to the inverse probability of demand of the revenue ratio of the lower valued segment to the higher valued segment. This equation defines the EMSRa algorithm which handles the two segment case. EMSRb is smarter and handles multiple segments by comparing the revenue of the lower segment to a demand weighted average of the revenues of the higher segments. Neither of these heuristics produces the exact right answer and increasingly implementations make use of Monte Carlo simulation to find optimal protection levels.

Since the mid-1990s, increasingly sophisticated mathematical models have been developed such as the dynamic programming formulation pioneered by Talluri and Van Ryzin which has led to more accurate estimates of bid prices. Bid prices represent the minimum price a seller should accept for a single piece of inventory and are popular control mechanisms for Hotels and Car Rental firms. Models derived from developments in financial engineering are intriguing but have been unstable and difficult to place the parameters in practice. Yield management tends to focus on environments that are less rational than the financial markets.

== Yield management system ==
Firms that engage in yield management usually use computer yield management systems to do so. The Internet has greatly facilitated this process.

Enterprises that use yield management periodically review transactions for goods or services already supplied and for goods or services to be supplied in the future. They may also review information (including statistics) about events (known future events such as holidays, or unexpected past events such as terrorist attacks), competitive information (including prices), seasonal patterns, and other pertinent factors that affect sales. The models attempt to forecast total demand for all products/services they provide, by market segment and price point. Since total demand normally exceeds what the particular firm can produce in that period, the models attempt to optimize the firm's outputs to maximize revenue.

The optimization attempts to answer the question: "Given our operating constraints, what is the best mix of products and/or services for us to produce and sell in the period, and at what prices, to generate the highest expected revenue?"

Optimization can help the firm adjust prices and to allocate capacity among market segments to maximize expected revenues. This can be done at different levels of detail:

- by goods (such as a seat on a flight or a seat at an opera production)
- by group of goods (such as the entire opera house or all the seats on a flight)
- by market (such as sales from Seattle and Minneapolis for a flight going Seattle-Minneapolis-Boston)
- overall (on all the routes an airline flies, or all the seats during an opera production season)

Yield management is particularly suitable when selling perishable products, i.e. goods that become unsellable at a point in time (for example air tickets just after a flight takes off). Industries that use yield management include airlines, hotels, stadiums and other venues with a fixed number of seats, and advertising. With an advance forecast of demand and pricing flexibility, buyers will self-sort based on their price sensitivity (using more power in off-peak hours or going to the theater mid-week), their demand sensitivity (must have the higher cost early morning flight or must go to the Saturday night opera) or their time of purchase (usually paying a premium for booking late).

In this way, yield management's overall aim is to provide an optimal mix of goods at a variety of price points at different points in time or for different baskets of features. The system will try to maintain a distribution of purchases over time that is balanced as well as high.

Good yield management maximizes (or at least significantly increases) revenue production for the same number of units, by taking advantage of the forecast of high demand/low demand periods, effectively shifting demand from high demand periods to low demand periods and by charging a premium for late bookings. While yield management systems tend to generate higher revenues, the revenue streams tends to arrive later in the booking horizon as more capacity is held for late sale at premium prices.

Firms faced with lack of pricing power sometimes turn to yield management as a last resort. After a year or two using yield management, many of them are surprised to discover they have actually lowered prices for the majority of their opera seats or hotel rooms or other products. That is, they offer far higher discounts more frequently for off-peak times, while raising prices only marginally for peak times, resulting in higher revenue overall.

By doing this, they have actually increased quantity demanded by selectively introducing many more price points, as they learn about and react to the diversity of interests and purchase drivers of their customers.

== Ethical issues and questions of efficacy ==
Some consumers are concerned that yield management could penalize them for conditions which cannot be helped and are unethical to penalize. For example, the formulas, algorithms, and neural networks that determine airline ticket prices could feasibly consider frequent flyer information, which includes a wealth of socio-economic information such as age and home address. The airline then could charge higher prices to consumers who are between certain ages or who live in neighborhoods with higher average wealth, even if those neighborhoods also include poor households. Very few (if any) airlines using yield management are able to employ this level of price discrimination because prices are not set based on characteristics of the purchaser, which are in any case often not known at the time of purchase.

Some consumers may object that it is impossible for them to boycott yield management when buying some goods, such as airline tickets.

Yield management also includes many noncontroversial and more prevalent practices, such as varying prices over time to reflect demand. This level of yield management makes up the majority of yield management in the airline industry. For example, airlines may price a ticket on the Sunday after Thanksgiving at a higher fare than the Sunday a week later. Alternatively, they may make tickets more expensive when bought at the last minute than when bought six months in advance. The goal of this level of yield management is essentially trying to force demand to equal or exceed supply.

When yield management was introduced in the early 1990s, primarily in the airline industry, many suggested that despite the obvious immediate increase in revenues, it might harm customer satisfaction and loyalty, interfere with relationship marketing, and drive customers from firms that used yield management to firms that do not. Frequent flier programs were developed as a response to regain customer loyalty and reward frequent and high yield passengers. Today, yield management is nearly universal in many industries, including airlines.

Despite optimizing revenue in theory, introduction of yield management does not always achieve that in practice because of corporate image problems. In 2002, Deutsche Bahn, the German national railway company, experimented with yield management for frequent loyalty card passengers. The fixed pricing model that had existed for decades was replaced with a more demand-responsive pricing model, but that reform proved highly unpopular with passengers and led to widespread protests and a decline in passenger numbers.

== Experimental studies of yield management decisions ==
Recently, people working in the area of behavioral operations research have begun to study the yield management decisions of actual human decision makers. One question that this research addresses is how much might revenues increase if managers relied on yield management systems rather than their own judgment when making pricing decisions. Using methods from experimental economics, this work has revealed that yield management systems are likely to increase revenues significantly. Further, this research reveals that "errors" in yield management decisions tend to be quite systematic. For instance, Bearden, Murphy, and Rappaport showed that with respect to expected revenue maximizing policies, people tend to price too high when they have high levels of inventory and too low when their inventory levels are low.

== See also ==
- Geo (marketing)
- Variable pricing
- Price discrimination
- Algorithmic pricing
- Last minute advertising
- Institute for Operations Research and the Management Sciences
- Behavioral Operations Research
- Revenue shortfall
- Revenue management
