= Orga =

Orga may refer to:

- Orga, Cyprus
- Irfan Orga (1908–1970), Turkish author
- Orga Sabnak, a character from Gundam SEED
- Orga Systems, a software company
- Kamen Rider Orga, a character from the Kamen Rider 555 film
- Orga, a monster from the 1999 movie Godzilla 2000
- ORGA (Organización Republicana Gallega Autónoma), a Spanish political party
