= Thomas S. Ferguson =

American mathematician and statistician

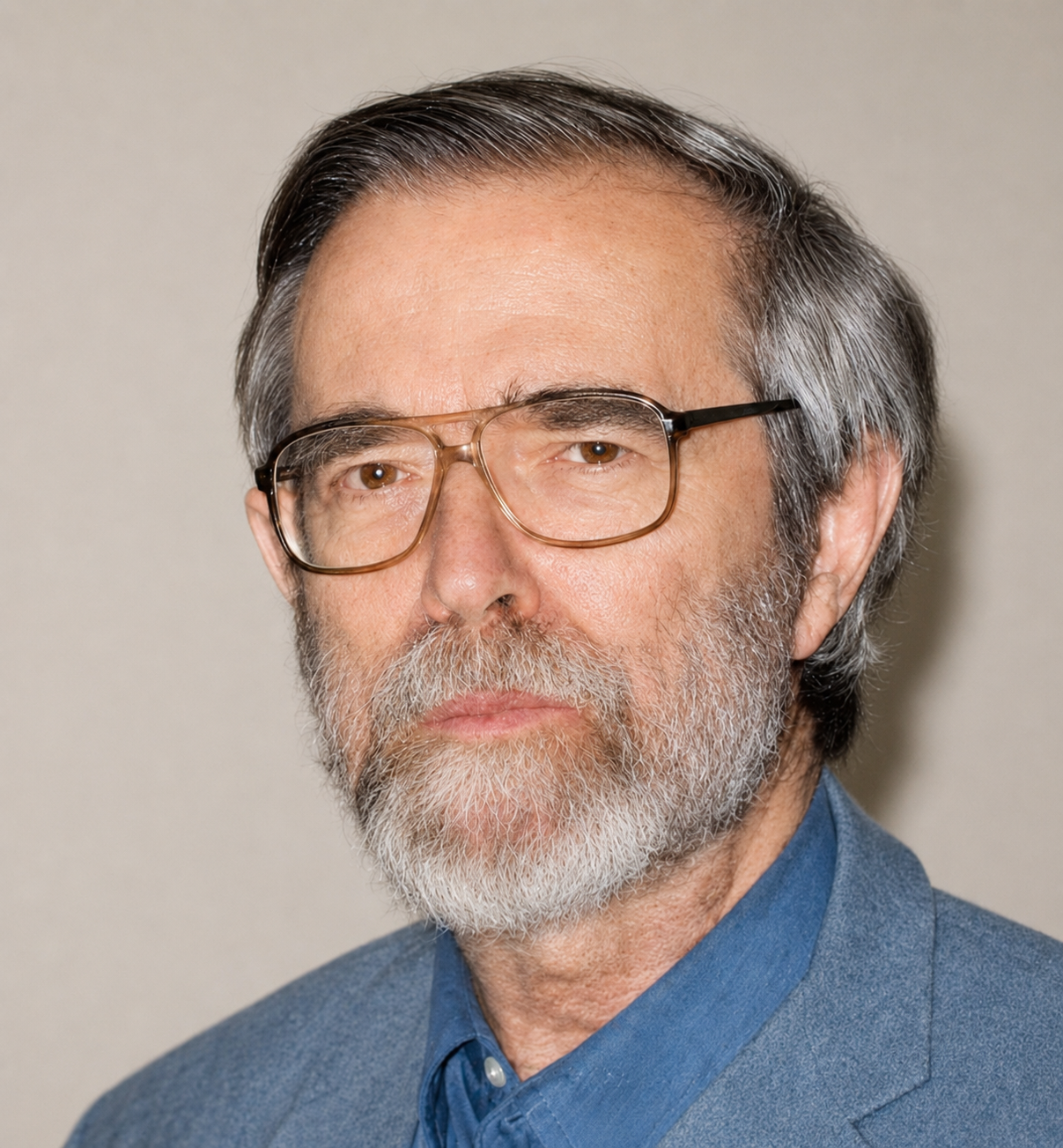
- Born: December 14, 1929 (age 96); Oakland, California, USA
- Spouse: Beatriz Rossello
- Children: Chris Ferguson

Academic background
- Education: University of California, Berkeley
- Thesis: On the Existence of Linear Regression in Linear Structural Relations (1956)
- Doctoral advisor: Lucien Le Cam

Academic work
- Discipline: Mathematical statistics Game theory
- Institutions: University of California, Los Angeles
- Notable students: Kevin McCardle; Lynn Kuo; Francisco Samaniego; Qiqing Yu
- Notable ideas: A foundational contribution to Bayesian nonparametric statistics.
- Website: www.math.ucla.edu/~tom/

Thomas Shelburne Ferguson (born December 14, 1929) is an American mathematician and statistician. He is a professor emeritus of mathematics and statistics at the University of California, Los Angeles.

== Education and career ==
Ferguson was born in Oakland, California and was raised nearby in Alameda, California. He majored in mathematics at the University of California, Berkeley, and completed his Ph.D. there in 1956. His dissertation had two separately-titled parts, On Existence of Linear Regression in Linear Structural Relations and A Method of Generating Best Asymptotically Normal Estimates with Application to the Estimation of Bacterial Densities; it was supervised by Lucien Le Cam.

After another year teaching at Berkeley, he moved to the University of California, Los Angeles in 1957. He was the supervisor of numerous doctorates.

== Contributions ==
Ferguson is the author of:

- Mathematical Statistics: A Decision Theoretic Approach (Academic Press, 1967)
- A Course in Large Sample Theory (Chapman & Hall, 1996)
- A Course in Game Theory (World Scientific, 2020)

His research contributions include the analysis of the "big match" zero-sum game with David Blackwell, a result that eventually led to the proof of existence of equilibrium values for limiting average payoff in all stochastic games. Ferguson is especially known for introducing the Dirichlet process, a foundational contribution to Bayesian nonparametric statistics i.e. the Ferguson distribution on prior probability; Ferguson's Dirichlet process). Ferguson's pairing property in the analysis of misère subtraction games; and contributions to the theory of optimal stopping as e.g. co-authored work on Robbins' problem. His work also connects decision-theoretic statistics, game theory, stochastic games, and optimal stopping.

== Recognition ==
Ferguson was named a Fellow of the Institute of Mathematical Statistics in 1967, and a Fellow of the American Statistical Association in 1985. He was given the Belgian International Francqui Chair of Science in 1998. A festschrift in Ferguson's honor edited by F. Thomas Bruss and Lucien Le Cam was published in 2000.

== Personal life ==
Ferguson married mathematician Beatriz Rossello, and is the father of poker player Chris Ferguson. He has coauthored papers with Chris Ferguson on the mathematics of poker and other games of chance.
