= Odds =

Ratio of the probability of an event happening versus not happening

In probability theory, odds provide a measure of the probability of a particular outcome. Odds are commonly used in gambling and statistics. For example for an event that is 40% probable, one could say that the odds are "2 in 5", "2 to 3 in favor", "2 to 3 on", or "3 to 2 against".

In gambling, odds are often given as the ratio of the possible net profit to the possible net loss, and sometimes this is called fractional odds. However in many situations, the possible loss ("stake" or "wager") is paid up front and, if the gambler wins, the net win plus the stake is returned. So wagering 2 at "3 to 2", pays out 3 + 2 = 5, which is called "5 for 2", and sometimes this is called decimal odds. When Moneyline odds are quoted as a positive number +X, it means that a wager pays X to 100. When Moneyline odds are quoted as a negative number −X, it means that a wager pays 100 to X.

Odds have a simple relationship with probability. When probability is expressed as a number between 0 and 1, the relationships between probability p and odds are as follows. Multiplying these probabilities by 100% gives the percentage.

- "X in Y" means that the probability is p = X / Y.
- "X to Y in favor" and "X to Y on" mean that the probability is p = X / (X + Y).
- "X to Y against" means that the probability is p = Y / (X + Y).
- "pays X to Y" means that the bet is a fair bet if the probability is p = Y / (X + Y).
- "pays X for Y" means that the bet is a fair bet if the probability is p = Y / X.
- "pays +X" (moneyline odds) means that the bet is fair if the probability is p = 100 / (X + 100).
- "pays −X" (moneyline odds) means that the bet is fair if the probability is p = X / (X + 100).

The numbers for odds can be scaled. If k is any positive number then X to Y is the same as kX to kY, and similarly if "to" is replaced with "in" or "for". For example, "3 to 2 against" is the same as both "1.5 to 1 against" and "6 to 4 against".

When the value of the probability p (between 0 and 1; not a percentage) can be written as a fraction N / D then the odds can be said to be "p/(1−p) to 1 in favor", "(1−p)/p to 1 against", "N in D", "N to D−N in favor", or "D−N to N against", and these can be scaled to equivalent odds. Similarly, fair betting odds can be expressed as "(1−p)/p to 1", "1/p for 1", "+100(1−p)/p", "−100p/(1−p)", "D−N to N", "D for N", "+100(D−N)/N", or "−100N/(D−N)".

== History ==
The language of odds, such as the use of phrases like "ten to one" for intuitively estimated risks, is found in the sixteenth century, well before the development of probability theory. Shakespeare wrote:

Knew that we ventured on such dangerous seas
That if we wrought out life 'twas ten to one

— William Shakespeare, Henry IV, Part II, Act I, Scene 1, lines 181–2

The sixteenth-century polymath Cardano demonstrated the efficacy of defining odds as the ratio of favourable to unfavourable outcomes. Implied by this definition is the fact that the probability of an event is given by the ratio of favourable outcomes to the total number of possible outcomes.

== Statistical usage ==
Calculation of probability (risk) vs odds

In statistics, odds are an expression of relative probabilities, generally quoted as the odds in favor. The odds (in favor) of an event or a proposition is the ratio of the probability that the event will happen to the probability that the event will not happen. Mathematically, this is a Bernoulli trial, as it has exactly two outcomes. In case of a finite sample space of equally probable outcomes, this is the ratio of the number of outcomes where the event occurs to the number of outcomes where the event does not occur; these can be represented as W and L (for Wins and Losses) or S and F (for Success and Failure). For example, the odds that a randomly chosen day of the week is during a weekend are two to five (2:5), as days of the week form a sample space of seven outcomes, and the event occurs for two of the outcomes (Saturday and Sunday), and not for the other five. Conversely, given odds as a ratio of integers, this can be represented by a probability space of a finite number of equally probable outcomes. These definitions are equivalent, since dividing both terms in the ratio by the number of outcomes yields the probabilities: $2:5 = (2/7):(5/7).$ Conversely, the odds against is the opposite ratio. For example, the odds against a random day of the week being during a weekend are 5:2.

Odds and probability can be expressed in prose via the prepositions to and in: "odds of so many to so many on (or against) [some event]" refers to odds—the ratio of numbers of (equally probable) outcomes in favor and against (or vice versa); "chances of so many [outcomes], in so many [outcomes]" refers to probability—the number of (equally probable) outcomes in favour relative to the number for and against combined. For example, "odds of a weekend are 2 to 5", while "chances of a weekend are 2 in 7". In casual use, the words odds and chances (or chance) are often used interchangeably to vaguely indicate some measure of odds or probability, though the intended meaning can be deduced by noting whether the preposition between the two numbers is to or in.

=== Mathematical relations ===
Odds can be expressed as a ratio of two numbers, in which case it is not unique—scaling both terms by the same factor does not change the proportions: 1:1 odds and 100:100 odds are the same (even odds). Odds can also be expressed as a number, by dividing the terms in the ratio—in this case it is unique (different fractions can represent the same rational number). Odds as a ratio, odds as a number, and probability (also a number) are related by simple formulas, and similarly odds in favor and odds against, and probability of success and probability of failure have simple relations. Odds range from 0 to infinity, while probabilities range from 0 to 1, and hence are often represented as a percentage between 0% and 100%: reversing the ratio switches odds for with odds against, and similarly probability of success with probability of failure.

Given odds (in favor) as the ratio W:L (number of outcomes that are wins:number of outcomes that are losses), the odds in favor (as a number) $o_f$ and odds against (as a number) $o_a$ can be computed by simply dividing, and are multiplicative inverses:

$$\begin{align}
o_f &= W/L = 1/o_a\\
o_a &= L/W = 1/o_f\\
o_f \cdot o_a &= 1
\end{align}$$

Analogously, given odds as a ratio, the probability of success p or failure q can be computed by dividing, and the probability of success and probability of failure sum to unity (one), as they are the only possible outcomes. In case of a finite number of equally probable outcomes, this can be interpreted as the number of outcomes where the event occurs divided by the total number of events:

$$\begin{align}
p &= W/(W+L) = 1 - q\\
q &= L/(W+L) = 1 - p\\
p + q &= 1
\end{align}$$

Given a probability p, the odds as a ratio is $p:q$ (probability of success to probability of failure), and the odds as numbers can be computed by dividing:

$$\begin{align}
o_f &= p/q = p/(1-p) = (1-q)/q\\
o_a &= q/p = (1-p)/p = q/(1-q)
\end{align}$$

Conversely, given the odds as a number $o_f,$ this can be represented as the ratio $o_f:1,$ or conversely $1:(1/o_f) = 1:o_a,$ from which the probability of success or failure can be computed:

$$\begin{align}
p &= o_f/(o_f+1) = 1/(o_a + 1)\\
q &= o_a/(o_a+1) = 1/(o_f + 1)
\end{align}$$

Thus if expressed as a fraction with a numerator of 1, probability and odds differ by exactly 1 in the denominator: a probability of 1 in 100 (1/100 = 1%) is the same as odds of 1 to 99 (1/99 = 0.0101... = 0.0̅1̅), while odds of 1 to 100 (1/100 = 0.01) is the same as a probability of 1 in 101 (1/101 = 0.00990099... = 0.0̅0̅9̅9̅). This is a minor difference if the probability is small (close to zero, or "long odds"), but is a major difference if the probability is large (close to one).

These are worked out for some simple odds:

odds (ratio)	$o_f$	$o_a$	$p$	$q$
1:1	1	1	50%	50%
0:1	0	∞	0%	100%
1:0	∞	0	100%	0%
2:1	2	0.5	66.6̅6̅%	33.3̅3̅%
1:2	0.5	2	33.3̅3̅%	66.6̅6̅%
4:1	4	0.25	80%	20%
1:4	0.25	4	20%	80%
9:1	9	0.1̅	90%	10%
10:1	10	0.1	90.9̅0̅%	9.0̅9̅%
99:1	99	0.0̅1̅	99%	1%
100:1	100	0.01	99.0̅0̅9̅9̅%	0.9̅9̅0̅0̅%

These transforms have certain special geometric properties: the conversions between odds for and odds against (resp. probability of success with probability of failure) and between odds and probability are all Möbius transformations (fractional linear transformations). They are thus specified by three points (sharply 3-transitive). Swapping odds for and odds against swaps 0 and infinity, fixing 1, while swapping probability of success with probability of failure swaps 0 and 1, fixing .5; these are both order 2, hence circular transforms. Converting odds to probability fixes 0, sends infinity to 1, and sends 1 to .5 (even odds are 50% probable), and conversely; this is a parabolic transform.

=== Applications ===
In probability theory and statistics, odds and similar ratios may be more natural or more convenient than probabilities. In some cases the log-odds are used, which is the logit of the probability. Most simply, odds are frequently multiplied or divided, and log converts multiplication to addition and division to subtractions. This is particularly important in the logistic model, in which the log-odds of the target variable are a linear combination of the observed variables.

Similar ratios are used elsewhere in statistics; of central importance is the likelihood ratio in likelihoodist statistics, which is used in Bayesian statistics as the Bayes factor.

Odds are particularly useful in problems of sequential decision making, as for instance in problems of how to stop (online) on a last specific event which is solved by the odds algorithm.

The odds are a ratio of probabilities; an odds ratio is a ratio of odds, that is, a ratio of ratios of probabilities. Odds-ratios are often used in analysis of clinical trials. While they have useful mathematical properties, they can produce counter-intuitive results: an event with an 80% probability of occurring is four times more probable to happen than an event with a 20% probability, but the odds are 16 times higher on the less probable event (4–1 against, or 4) than on the more probable one (1–4 against, 4-1 in favor, 4–1 on, or 0.25).

Example #1
There are 5 pink marbles, 2 blue marbles, and 8 purple marbles. What are the odds in favor of picking a blue marble?

Answer: The odds in favour of a blue marble are 2:13. One can equivalently say that the odds are 13:2 against. There are 2 out of 15 chances in favour of blue, 13 out of 15 against blue.

In probability theory and statistics, where the variable p is the probability in favor of a binary event, and the probability against the event is therefore 1-p, "the odds" of the event are the quotient of the two, or $\frac{p}{1-p}$. That value may be regarded as the relative probability the event will happen, expressed as a fraction (if it is less than 1), or a multiple (if it is equal to or greater than one) of the likelihood that the event will not happen.

Example #2

In the first example at top, saying the odds of a Sunday are "one to six" or, less commonly, "one-sixth" means the probability of picking a Sunday randomly is one-sixth the probability of not picking a Sunday. While the mathematical probability of an event has a value in the range from zero to one, "the odds" in favor of that same event lie between zero and infinity. The odds against the event with probability given as p are $\frac{1-p}{p}$. The odds against Sunday are 6:1 or 6/1 = 6. It is 6 times as probable that a random day is not a Sunday.

== Gambling usage ==
On a coin toss or a match race between two evenly matched horses, it is reasonable for two people to wager level stakes. However, in more variable situations, such as a multi-runner horse race or a football match between two unequally matched teams, betting "at odds" provides the possibility to take the respective likelihoods of the possible outcomes into account. The use of odds in gambling facilitates betting on events where the probabilities of different outcomes vary.

In the modern era, most fixed-odd betting takes place between a betting organisation, such as a bookmaker, and an individual, rather than between individuals. Different traditions have grown up in how to express odds to customers.

=== Fractional odds ===
Favoured by bookmakers in the United Kingdom and Ireland, and also common in horse racing, fractional odds quote the net profit that will be paid out to the bettor, should they win, relative to the stake. Odds of 4/1 (4 to 1 against) would imply that the bettor stands to make a £400 profit on a £100 stake. If the odds are 1/4 (1 to 4 against, 4 to 1 in favor, or 4 to 1 on), the bettor will profit £25 on a £100 stake. In either case, having won, the bettor always receives the original stake back too; so if the odds are 4/1 the bettor receives a total of £500 (£400 plus the original £100). Odds of 1/1 are known as evens or even money.

The numerator and denominator of fractional odds are often integers, thus if the bookmaker's payout was to be £1.25 profit for every £1 stake, this would be equivalent to £5 profit for every £4 staked, and the odds would therefore be expressed as 5/4. However, not all fractional odds are traditionally read using the lowest common denominator (i.e. simplifying the fraction when possible). For example consider the odd 6/4; given that there is a pattern of odds of 5/4, 7/4, 9/4 and so on that are more readily compared to 6/4 than 3/2, and so may be shown as such.

Fractional odds are also known as British odds, UK odds, or, in the UK, traditional odds. They are typically represented with a "/" or the word "to" but can also be represented with a "-", e.g. 4/1 or 4–1. Odds with a denominator of 1 are often presented in listings as the numerator only.

A variation of fractional odds is known as Hong Kong odds. Fractional and Hong Kong odds are actually exchangeable. The only difference is that the UK odds are presented as a fractional notation (e.g. 6/5) whilst the Hong Kong odds are decimal (e.g. 1.2). Both exhibit give the ratio of the profit to the stake.

=== Decimal odds ===
The decimal odds (also described as European odds) also represent the potential winnings (net profit), but in addition they factor in the stake. For example, 6/5 fractional odds (also described as "1.2" or "6 to 5") are the same as 11/5 decimal odds (also described as 2.2 or "11 for 5).

Favoured in continental Europe, Australia, New Zealand, Canada, and Singapore, decimal odds quote the ratio of the payout amount, including the original stake, to the stake itself. Therefore, the decimal odds of an outcome are equivalent to the decimal value of the fractional odds plus one. Thus even odds 1/1 (1 to 1) are quoted in decimal odds as 2.00 (2 for 1). The 4/1 (4 to 1) fractional odds discussed above are quoted as 5.00 (5 for 1), while the 1/4 (1 to 4) odds are quoted as 1.25 (5 for 4, or 1.25 for 1). This is useful for parlay betting, because fair decimal odds for a parlay are the product of the decimal odds for each individual outcome. When looking at decimal odds in betting terms, the underdog has the higher of the two decimals, while the favorite has the lower of the two. The equation for calculating decimal odds is Payout (including initial wager) = Initial Wager × Decimal Value. For example, if one bets €100 on Liverpool to beat Manchester City at 2.00 (2 for 1) odds, the payout, including the stake, would be €200 (€100 × 2.00). Fair decimal odds equal the reciprocal of the probability of an outcome. For example, fair decimal odds of 5.00 means a probability of 1 / 5.00 (i.e., 0.20 or 20%).

Decimal odds are also known as European odds, digital odds or continental odds.

=== Moneyline odds ===
Moneyline odds are favoured by American bookmakers. The figure quoted is either positive or negative.

- When moneyline odds are positive, the figure indicates the net winnings for a $100 wager (this is done for an outcome that is considered less probable to happen than not). For example, net winnings of 4/1 would be quoted as +400.
- When moneyline odds are negative, the figure indicates how much money must be wagered to for a net winning of $100 (this is done for an outcome that is considered more probable to happen than not). For example, net winnings of 1/4 would be quoted as −400.

Moneyline odds are often referred to as American odds. A "moneyline" wager refers to odds on the straight-up outcome of a game with no consideration to a point spread. In most cases, the favorite will have negative moneyline odds (less payoff for a safer bet) and the underdog will have positive moneyline odds (more payoff for a risky bet). However, if the teams are evenly matched, both teams can have a negative line at the same time (e.g. −110 −110 or −105 −115), due to house take.

=== Wholesale odds ===
Wholesale odds are the "real odds" or 100% probability of an event occurring. This 100% book is displayed without any bookmaker's profit margin, often referred to as a bookmaker's "overround" built in.

A "wholesale odds" index is an index of all the prices in a probabilistic market operating at 100% competitiveness and displayed without any profit margin factored for market participants.

== Gambling odds versus probabilities ==
In gambling, the odds on display do not represent the true chances (as imagined by the bookmaker) that the event will or will not occur, but are the amount that the bookmaker will pay out on a winning bet, together with the required stake. In formulating the odds to display the bookmaker will have included a profit margin which effectively means that the payout to a successful bettor is less than that represented by the true chance of the event occurring. This profit is known as the 'overround' on the 'book' (the 'book' refers to the old-fashioned ledger in which wagers were recorded, and is the derivation of the term 'bookmaker') and relates to the sum of the 'odds' in the following way:

In a 3-horse race, for example, the true probabilities of each of the horses winning based on their relative abilities may be 50%, 40% and 10%. The total of these three percentages is 100%, thus representing a fair 'book'. The true odds against winning for each of the three horses are 1–1, 3–2 and 9–1, respectively.

In order to generate a profit on the wagers accepted, the bookmaker may decide to increase the values to 60%, 50% and 20% for the three horses, respectively. This represents the odds against each, which are 4–6, 1–1 and 4–1, in order. These values now total 130%, meaning that the book has an overround of 30 (130−100). This value of 30 represents the amount of profit for the bookmaker if he gets bets requiring him to pay out the same amount no matter which horse wins. For example, if he takes £60, £50, and £20 of stakes, respectively, for the three horses, he receives £130 in wagers but only pays £100 back (including stakes), whichever horse wins. The expected value of his profit is positive even if everybody bets on the same horse, because the odds for each horse are worse than the actual probabilities. The art of bookmaking is in setting the odds low enough so as to have a positive expected value of profit while keeping the odds high enough to attract customers, and at the same time attracting enough bets for each outcome to reduce his risk exposure. If he can attract the same number of bets (actually, the same payout amounts) for each outcome, then he is sure not to lose money, and will make a profit if his overround is positive. Since he wants to minimize the uncertainty for himself, he needs to adjust the odds so as to get close to equal amounts of betting for the different outcomes.

A study on soccer betting found that the probability for the home team to win was generally about 3.4% less than the value calculated from the odds (for example, 46.6% for even odds). It was about 3.7% less for wins by the visitors, and 5.7% less for draws.

Making a profit in gambling involves predicting the relationship of the true probabilities to the payout odds. Sports information services are often used by professional and semi-professional sports bettors to help achieve this goal.

The odds or amounts the bookmaker will pay are determined by the total amount that has been bet on all of the possible events. They reflect the balance of wagers on either side of the event, and include the deduction of a bookmaker's brokerage fee ("vig" or vigorish).

Also, depending on how the betting is affected by jurisdiction, taxes may be involved for the bookmaker and/or the winning player. This may be taken into account when offering the odds and/or may reduce the amount won by a player.

== See also ==
- Odds ratio
- Odds algorithm
- Galton board
- Gambling mathematics
- Formal mathematical specification of logistic regression
- Optimal stopping
- Parimutuel betting
- Statistical association football predictions
