= Marriage problem =

In mathematics, marriage problem may refer to:

- Assignment problem, consisting of finding a maximum weight matching in a weighted bipartite graph
- Secretary problem, also called the sultan's dowry or best choice problem, in optimal stopping theory
- Stable marriage problem, the problem of finding a stable matching between two equally sized sets of elements given an ordering of preferences for each element
