= Robbins problem =

The Robbins problem may mean either of:

- the Robbins conjecture that all Robbins algebras are Boolean algebras.
- Robbins' problem of optimal stopping in probability theory.
