= RKN =

RKN may refer to:

- Redknee, a Canadian telecommunications company with the stock name RKN
- The Mega Man Killers, antagonists from the Mega Man series
- Roskomnadzor, Russian federal executive agency responsible for monitoring, controlling and censoring Russian mass media.
