= Behavioral operations management =

Behavioral operations management (often called behavioral operations) examines and takes into consideration human behaviours and emotions when facing complex decision problems. It relates to the behavioral aspects of the use of operations research and operations management. In particular, it focuses on understanding behavior in, with and beyond models. The general purpose is to make better use and improve the use of operations theories and practice, so that the benefits received from the potential improvements to operations approaches in practice, that arise from recent findings in behavioral sciences, are realized. Behavioral operations approaches have heavily influenced supply chain management research among others.

== Overview ==
Operations management involves a wide range of problem–solving skills aiming to help individuals or organizations to make more rational decisions as well as improving their efficiency. However, operations management often assumes that agents involved in the process or operating system, such as employees, consumers and suppliers, make fully rational decisions. Their decisions are not affected by their emotions as well as their surroundings and that they are able to react and distinguish between different types of information. In reality, this is not always true; human behavior has an important role in decision making and worker motivation, and therefore should be considered in the study of operations. This has led to the rise of behavioral operations management, which is defined as the study of impacts that human behavior has on operations, design and business interactions in different organizations. Behavioral operations management aims to understand the decision making of managers and tries to make improvements to the supply chain using the insight obtained. Behavioral operations management includes knowledge from a number of fields, such as economics, behavioral science, psychology and other social sciences. Traditional operations management and behavioral operations management have a common intellectual goal, aiming to make differences in operations outcomes, such as flexibility, efficiency and productivity.

== Theoretical influence ==
Humans have limitations in their ability to collect and react to relevant information. When a decision or conclusion has to be made through complex information, human decision-makers often fail to comply with normative decision theories. Moreover, a person's lifestyle, social interactions and collective behaviors have a clear influence on their decisions.

The breakdown of cognitive psychology study which refers to the study of human mental processes and their role in thinking, feeling and behaving

=== Cognitive psychology ===
This is a relatively new branch of psychology which focuses on humans' ability to make decisions, solve problems, learning, attention, memory and forgetting. These are only a few of the practical applications of this science, to some extent it is also related to motivation and emotion. Cognitive psychology is interested in what is happening within the mind when new information is received, how people respond to this information, and how this response affects their behavior and emotions. Cognitive psychology is considered to be one of the dominant theoretical force in behavioral science.

=== Social psychology ===
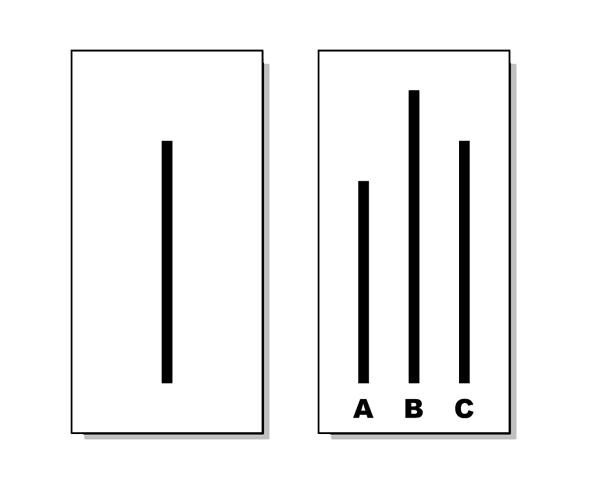
The Asch experiment shows that participants tend to adhere to the group norms

People often react and behave differently when they are put into different social situations. The aim of social psychology is to understand the nature and causes of individual behaviors. It questions or provides an insight of how human behavior relies on the physical environment. Social psychology theories attempt to explain why there are competition between individuals, why it is often the case that individuals or organisations seek to protect and maintain their status, and why it has been observed that individuals and organisations are willing to sacrifice efficiency to achieve their goal of staying at a higher hierarchical position. In addition to status, social psychology also includes people's behavior towards goal setting, feedback and controls, interdependence, and reciprocity.

=== Organizational behavior ===
The use of psychology in behavioral operations research links to the idea of judging the relationship between people's mental health and wellbeing and their behavior at work. Psychology experts often set up indicators to evaluate how an employee's surroundings, such as working environment and noise, can affect their productivity. Organizational behavior is the study of ways people react or behave when they are organized in groups. The purpose of these studies is to improve business productivity, trying to create a more efficient business organization. Organizational behavior theories are applied towards human resource trying to maximize the output from individual group members. The study of organization behavior can be broken down into different sections, including personality, job satisfaction and reward management, leadership, authority, power and politics.

== Main streams of research ==
There are four main streams of research that can be considered a part of behavior operations research. These give us an idea of the weakness of the current operations research model and the effectiveness of behavioral operations research in predicting human decisions and reactions when facing different situations.

=== Socio-technical view of technology management ===
Physical technologies can be defined as a socio-technology system, which consists of humans, human activity, spaces, artifacts, tools, and communications media. This theory suggests that social interaction at the workplace is determined by the technology and techniques used at work. Therefore, a change in technology used at work can lead to unexpected consequences. This may include differences in motivation.

=== Human factor engineering ===
Human factor engineering can be applied to improve workplaces, working systems and products aiming to reduce human errors during operations as well as improving human efficiency, productivity and operational performance. It often involves improvements of large machineries to reduce accidents during work. It is believed that behavior operations research can be related to human factor engineering as systematic errors, which happens very often technology and different machineries, can affect people's decision making and their interaction with the operating system.

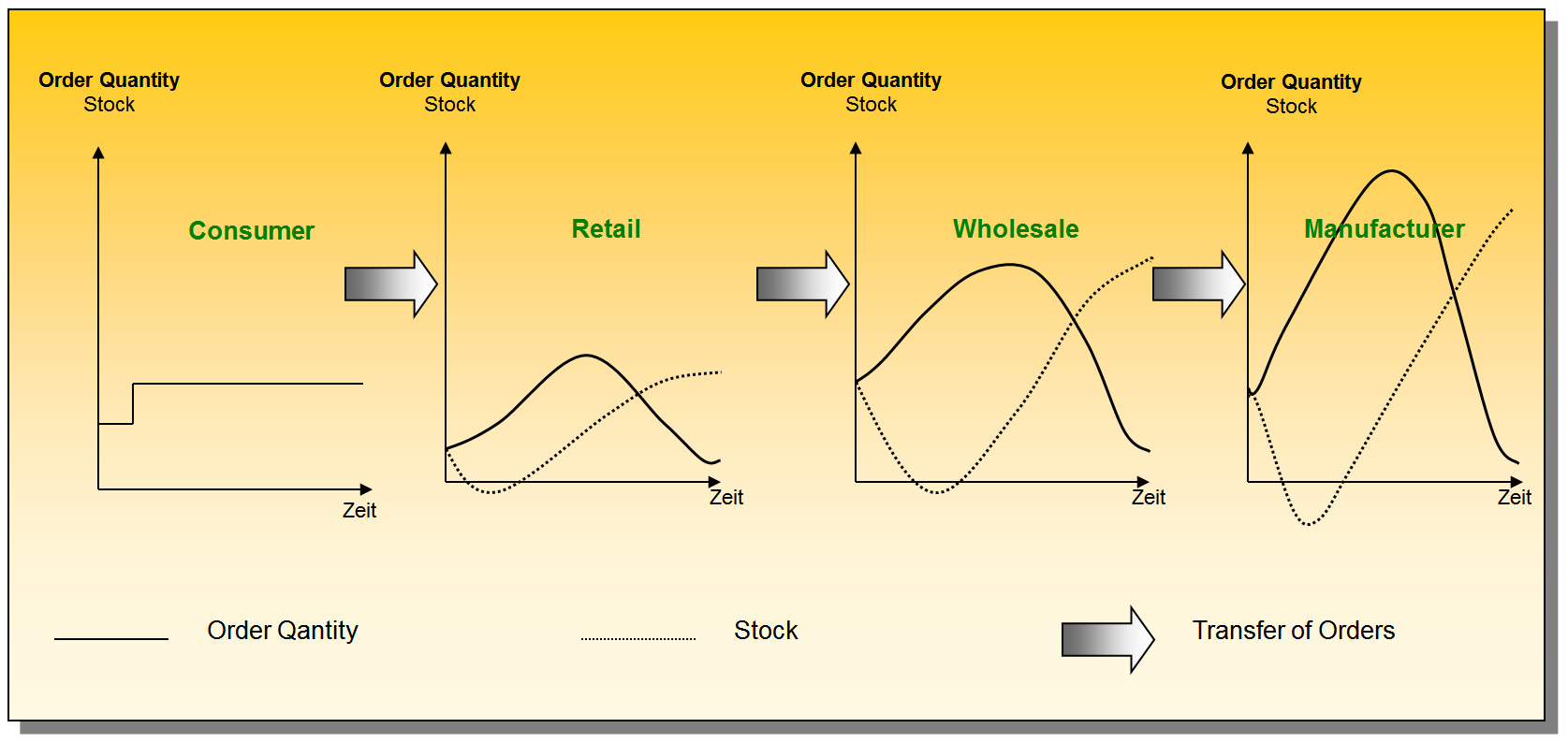
Visualisation of the bullwhip effect

=== The bullwhip effect ===
The bullwhip effect happens along the supply chain as the result of information asymmetry between the organisations involved. The classic scenario is a sudden increase in customer demand as shown in the figure to the right. The sudden demand hike depletes the retailer's stock resulting in lost sales. To avoid this happen in the future, the retailer does not only increase its next order to the wholesaler by the additional customer demand observed in this period, but by a little bit more just to be safe. That is because the retailer knows it takes time for the wholesaler to deliver the larger order. This fear of losing out in future sales is the behavioral component of the inventory problem causing the bullwhip effect. Faced with an unexpectedly larger order by the retailer, the wholesaler will forward an even larger order to the manufacturer. The manufacturer in turn makes a non-reversible decision to increase its production level even more in the nearer future. However, because of the delay in information flow from customers to manufactures, the latter is not aware for several order periods that its production level actually exceeds customer demand considerably. The result of the bullwhip effect in this classic application is an excessive amount of stock held by retailers, wholesalers and manufacturer. The more tiers a supply chain has, the larger the magnitude of the bullwhip effect becomes.

=== System dynamics models in operations contexts ===
System dynamics models in operations contexts focuses on the importance of how components in a system interact with each other as well as providing an overview of the processes that takes place within the system. Behavioral operations research often benefits from the development of comprehensive systems models as they are able to analyse and provide an insight of the operational system. This allows the study of behavioral operations to understand how people in these settings or work conditions think about the context in which they operate. In an operations system, it often involves levers for managers to manipulate the components involved in the system. The uses of these levers are determined by human behaviors and these behaviors include feelings of stress and fear.

== Related problems ==
=== Newsvendor problem ===
The newsvendor model (or newsboy or single-period or perishable) is a mathematical model used in operations management and applied economics to determine optimal level products or services to keep in stock when the demand is unknown. This model is also known as the newsvendor problem by analogy with the situation faced by a newspaper vendor who must make on time stocking decision of how many copies of newspaper to keep in stock when facing uncertain demand. If the newspaper vendor stocks too much, these newspaper may end up worthless by the end of the day as they are no longer up-to-date. However, if the newspaper vendor stocks too little, he misses the opportunity to make more profit and suffers loss of goodwill.

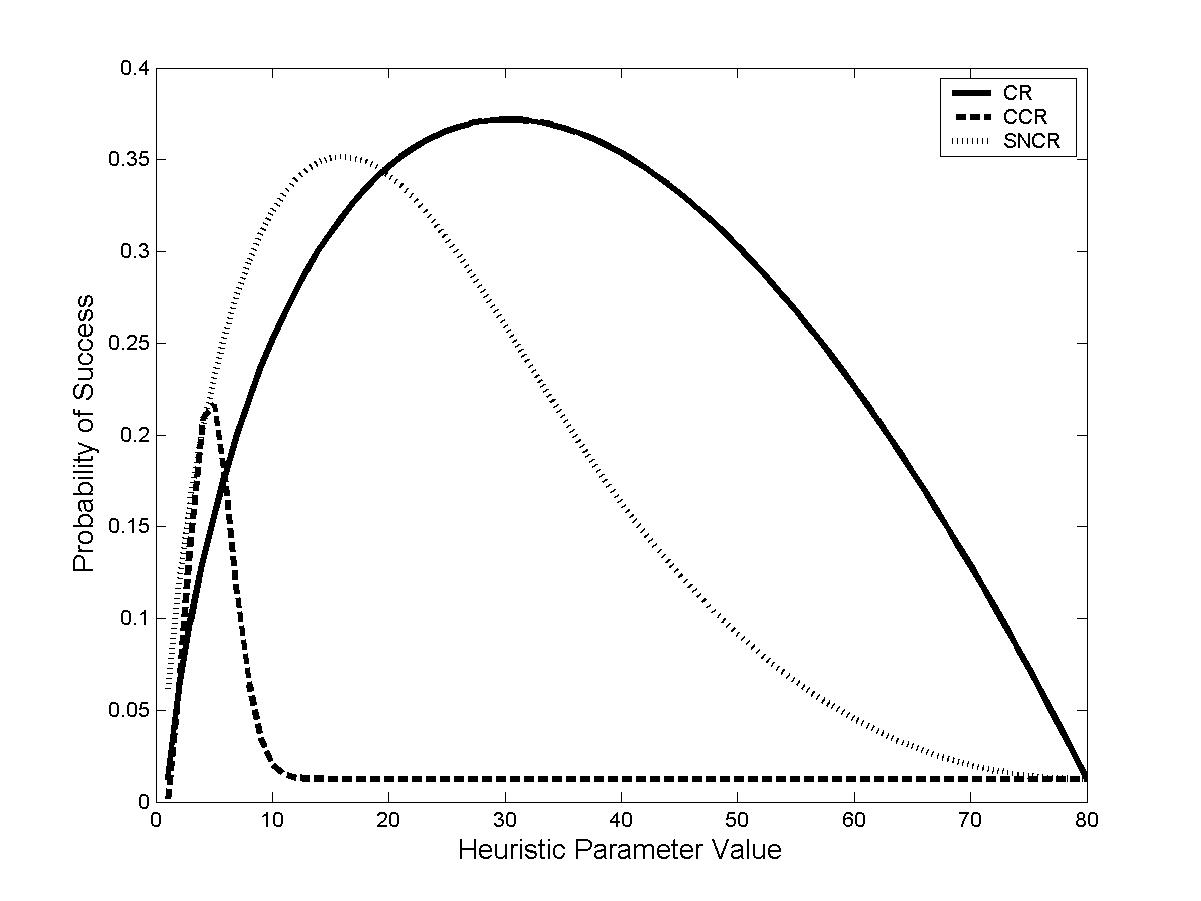
Heuristic performance regarding the secretary problem – Expected success probabilities for three heuristics

=== Assignment problem ===
The assignment problem is a complex optimization problem. The problem involves number of agents and a number of tasks. The purpose is to assign each agent with a task. All agents are expected or aimed to be allocated in a way that will maximize productivity and efficiency and minimize the total cost of the assignment.

=== Secretary problem ===
The secretary problem can also be called the optimal stopping theory. It focuses heavily on applied probability, statistics and decision theory. The idea behind the secretary problem is that to make the best decisions when there is a pool of different options, other options are unknown, details of other options will only be given if the currently existing option is given up. The problem comes down to the idea of optimal strategy, maximizing the probability of selecting the best option.

== See also ==
- Outline of management
