= Lynn Kuo =

Professor of statistics

Lynn Kuo (born 1949) is a professor emerita of statistics at the University of Connecticut known for her work on statistical decision theory, software reliability, and Bayesian inference in phylogeny. With Ming-Hui Chen and Paul O. Lewis, she is the author of Bayesian Phylogenetics: Methods, Algorithms, and Applications (CRC Press, 2014).

== Education and career ==
Kuo did both her undergraduate and graduate studies at the University of California, Los Angeles, completing her PhD in 1980. Her dissertation, supervised by Thomas S. Ferguson, was Computations and Applications of Mixtures of Dirichlet Processes. She has worked at the Jet Propulsion Lab, the United States Department of Agriculture, and the Statistical and Applied Mathematical Sciences Institute before joining the Connecticut faculty.

She was the treasurer of the New England Statistical Society, and has also worked as treasurer for the International Chinese Statistical Association.

== Awards and honors ==
Kuo is a fellow of the American Statistical Association, and an elected member of the International Statistical Institute. In 2013, she won the Outstanding Service Award of the International Chinese Statistical Association.
