= Littlewood's rule =

The earliest revenue management model is known as Littlewood’s rule, developed by Ken Littlewood while working at British Overseas Airways Corporation.

== The two class model ==
Littlewood proposed the first static single-resource quantity-based RM model. It was a solution method for the seat inventory problem for a single-leg flight with two fare classes. Those two fare classes have a fare of $R_1$ and $R_2$, whereby $R_1> R_2$. The total capacity is $C$ and demand for class $j$ is indicated with $D_j$. The demand has a probability distribution whose cumulative distribution function is denoted $F_j$. The demand for class 2 comes before demand for class 1. The question now is how much demand for class 2 should be accepted so that the optimal mix of passengers is achieved and the highest revenue is obtained. Littlewood suggests closing down class 2 when the certain revenue from selling another low fare seat is exceeded by the expected revenue of selling the same seat at the higher fare. In formula form this means: accept demand for class 2 as long as:

$$R_2 \ge R_1 \cdot \operatorname{Prob}( D_1>x )$$

where

$R_2$ is the value of the lower valued segment
$R_1$ is the value of the higher valued segment
$D_1$ is the demand for the higher valued segment and
$x$ is the capacity left

This suggests that there is an optimal protection limit $y_1^\star$. If the capacity left is less than this limit demand for class 2 is rejected. If a continuous distribution $F_j(x)$ is used to model the demand, then $y_1^\star$ can be calculated using what is called Littlewood’s rule:

Littlewood's rule

$y_1^\star = F_1^{-1} \left(1-\frac{R_2}{R_1} \right)$

This gives the optimal protection limit, in terms of the division of the marginal revenue of both classes.

Alternatively bid prices can be calculated via

$$\pi(x) = R_1 \cdot \operatorname{Prob} ( D_1>x )$$

Littlewood's model is limited to two classes. Peter Belobaba developed a model based on this rule called expected marginal seat revenue, abbreviated as EMSR, which is an $n$-class model

== See also ==
- Yield management
- Expected marginal seat revenue
