= Real-time charging =

Real-time charging is an extension of call accounting that enables communications service providers (CSPs) to apply customer-specific rules for rating, discounting, promotions and settlements to better personalize the telecom experience. As CSPs begin to roll out advanced networks and services, offering and making money on these services requires the ability to do real-time charging.

Real-time charging came into existence to serve the needs of prepaid mobile phone carriers as they sought to enter market segments where the traditional subscription model was no longer applicable, Pre-paid offers required instant evaluation of both the cost and the ability to pay for a telecommunications service, followed by in-call decrementing of the balance. These real-time attributes began to be demanded for service offers other than pre-paid. For instance, to create a spend limit in a post-paid account the account balance must be continuously monitored to detect when the limit is reached and take the appropriate action e.g. suspend calling or send a warning SMS. Real time charging has been in place within the enterprise market for a number of years, most notably in the hospitality industry where transient guest required real time resolution of charges and payments. Enterprise markets are not centered on subscribers but as components of a broader employee or customer relationship or transaction.

While enterprises may have long possessed real time capabilities, CSPs are replacing or augmenting their existing, offline billing systems with real-time systems, that are capable of supporting pre-paid and post-paid services, as well as wired services. In the process, these real-time systems are creating new revenue opportunities for CSPs.

Real-time charging systems are part of the telecom industry trend toward convergence. For example, CSPs that offer triple play and quadruple play packages can use real-time systems to charge for services that span disparate networks and technologies, such as wireline, wireless, circuit-switched and Internet Protocol (IP).

Transforming subscriber experiences

CSPs are using real-time charging to create customer-centric charging models based on lifestyle, profession, age, interests or other segmentation by creating packages with virtually any mix of video, fixed voice, high-speed Internet, and mobile services to boost usage, loyalty, and market share. Examples of this include:

- Offering affinity charging plans and promotions based on any group relationships, like businesses, clubs, and families;
- Sweetening plans with volume discounts, cross-product promotions, and bundles — like free movies or music downloads for loyal users of any service;
- Setting easy-to-understand fees for services or content;
- Enabling simultaneous use of services;
- Offering hybrid prepaid/postpaid accounts;
- Charging by subscription, time, usage, or content type; and
- Triggering features, discounts, and plans in real time based on usage.

Real-time charging market

Analysts predict strong sales of real-time charging products over the next several years, with the worldwide market expected to grow from $2.6 billion in 2007 to more than $4.4 billion in 2012.

Top market players include Telcordia, Volubill, Ericsson, HP, Openet, Oracle, Orga Systems, Nokia Networks and Redknee, according to OSS Observer. In the hospitality enterprise marketplace, the top players include SDD's JAZZ Fusion and TigerTMS' Hotel Pro and CUB
