= Remnant advertising =

Remnant advertising refers to advertising space that has been sold by a publisher to a third party after they have completed direct negotiations with advertisers, which are then bundled and resold at a discount. Remnant advertising slots on websites are generally sold by ad exchanges.
