= Orga Systems =

Orga Systems GmbH
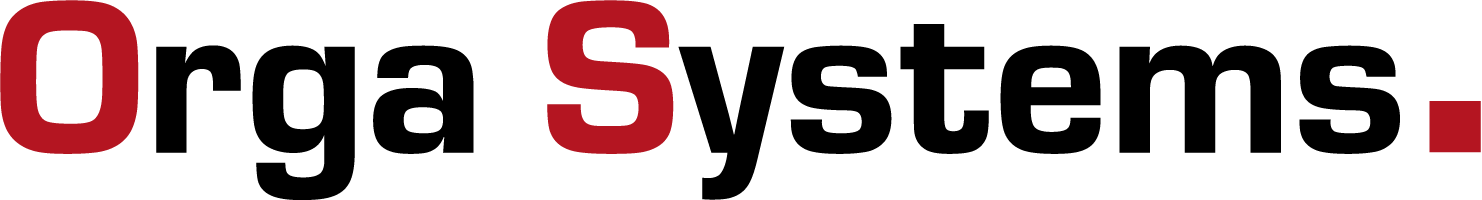
- Company type: LLC
- Industry: Software, Programming, Telecommunications, Consulting
- Founded: Paderborn (1997)
- Headquarters: Paderborn, Germany
- Key people: Wolfgang Kroh, CEO, Roland Kirch, CFO, Dr Ralf Guckert, CTO
- Products: GOLD Convergent Charging and Billing, GOLD Catalog and Order Management, GOLD Smart Prepaid Utility Billing, Consulting Services
- Number of employees: 730+

Orga Systems was a software vendor for unified billing and payment systems with global clients in telecommunications, utilities, and automotive markets.

The medium-sized company was headquartered in Paderborn, Germany, and operated in 11 additional locations: Berlin (Germany), Buenos Aires (Argentina), Dubai (UAE), Istanbul (Turkey), Kolkata (India), Kuala Lumpur (Malaysia), Kyiv (Ukraine), Madrid (Spain), Moscow (Russia), Rio de Janeiro (Brazil), and Rome (Italy).

Orga Systems provided instant billing, unified management rules integrated policy control and charging, as well as order processing.

In March 2015, Orga Systems filed for bankruptcy.

In June 2015, Orga Systems was acquired by Redknee.

== History ==
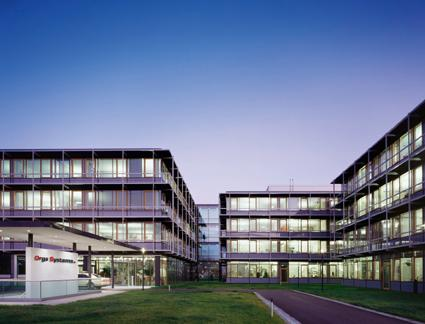
Orga Systems, Paderborn

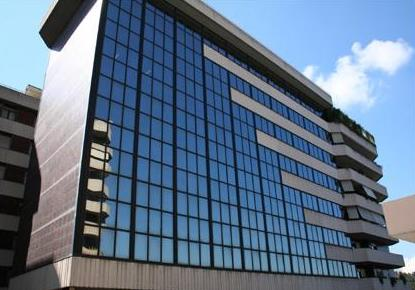
Orga Systems, Rome

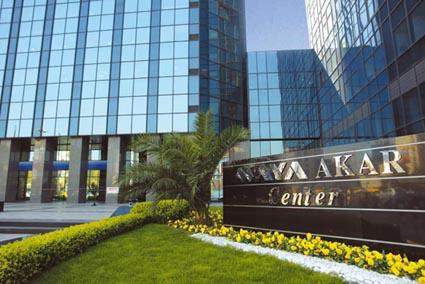
Orga Systems, Istanbul

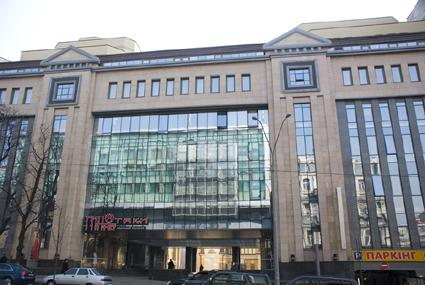
Orga Systems, Kyiv

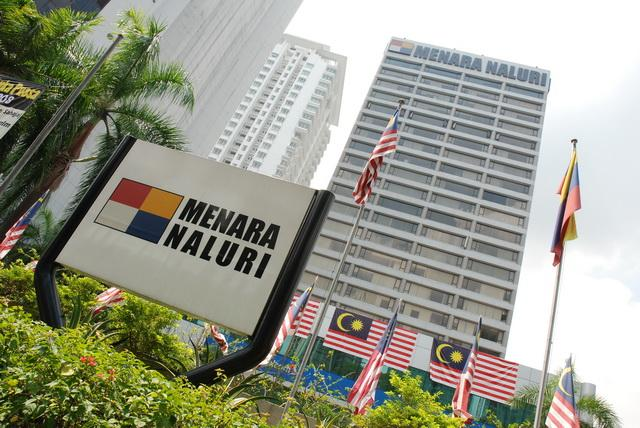
Orga Systems, Kuala Lumpur

Orga Systems began as a global supplier of advanced card systems for cell phone services, banks, retail, health care and the Internet. In the mid-1990s, two separate business units “chip card production“ and “system development“ were created. On 1 January 2003, the division of the two business units led to the spin-off of the system development department and Orga Systems GmbH was established.

Under a new private shareholder, Orga Systems took over and founded further subsidiaries. At the same time, there was a planned emphasis on instant systems for customer billing and administration in mobile telecommunication services.

In 1994, Orga Systems launched the world's first prepaid mobile payment system in Portugal. Over the years Orga Systems have increased its range of services. Based on the company's real-time expertise gained in the telco environment, Orga Systems started to exploit new markets in the field of industries such as Utilities and Automotive.

== Industry Recognition ==
Over the years Orga Systems won a number of awards within its industry, including:

- 2013 Pipeline Innovation Award “Vendor of the Year”
- 2013 Pipeline Innovation Award "Innovation in Customer Experience Management" (Runners-up)
- 2013 Pipeline Innovation Award "Innovation in Connectivity" (Runners-up)
- 2012 Global Telecoms Business Innovation Award “Wireless Network Infrastructure Innovation”
- 2012 Global Telecoms Business Innovation Award “Smart Grid Infrastructure Innovation”
- 2012 Pipeline Innovation Award “Advanced Connectivity”
- 2012 Pipeline Innovation Award “Best Deployment”
- 2012 Global Telecoms Business “Power100”
- 2011 Broadband Traffic Management Award “Best Use Of Traffic Management For Improving Customer Experience”
- 2011 Global Telecoms Business “Power100”
- 2010 Global Telecoms Business Innovation Award "Convergent Billing Innovation"
- 2010 Global Telecoms Business “Power100”
- 2009 “Top Job Award” for exceptional human resource management
- 2008 TM Forum Management World Excellence Award "Most Innovative Application of Customer Care"
- 2008 Global Telecoms Business Innovation Award "Emerging Markets Service Innovation"
- 2007 World BSS Award “Overall Best Contribution to BSS”
