= Real time policy =

Real time policy, in telecommunications, is a technical capability used to implement a wide array of business rules and subscriber preferences. While the genesis of policy was in quality of service (QoS) and congestion control, it has evolved as Communications Service Providers (CSPs) use it to create personalized, user-directed and interactive services and implement business objectives.

Real-time policy enables CSPs to follow the trend of “mass customization” to hyper-tailor services and customer experiences in real time, tailoring news delivery, content screening rules, display preferences, pricing, among other options, to fit every individual preference, requirement, and lifestyle.

Drivers for the roll-out of real-time policy functionality include:

- The ability to differentiate offerings in crowded/competitive markets;
- The need/desire to boost revenues; and
- The need to reduce churn by increased customer loyalty and service usage.

Examples of real-time policy include:

- User preference policies – Includes parental or corporate controls, content filters, calendaring restrictions, authorized-user lists and spending controls, among others.
- Targeted promotion/advertisement policies – Policies that guide how and what types of ads are delivered, including number of ads to be sent, content of ads and delivery methods;
- Content management policies – Policies based on rules around how content is delivered. For instance, content management can be used to protect minors from adult material, restrict business users from unrelated or inappropriate downloads, or simply classify which “persona” or account pays for what content-types;
- Handoff and network access policies for seamless mobility – Users have control over whether or not their devices will switch amongst various network types, such as WiFi, cellular or microcell, to take advantage of various quality boosts or costs savings; and
- Usage limits/bandwidth policies – CSPs can adjust upload/download speeds, bandwidth consumption based on a subscribers' plan.

== Market Adoption ==
kajeet utilized real time policy to become one of the first service providers to launch a mobile service aimed at preteens, featuring an array of parental control features. Large CSPs such as T-Mobile have followed suit based on market demand.

== Role In Advertising ==
Real time policy's role controlling the delivery of interactive advertising is being explored in the TM Forum’s Content Encounter, which aims to make seamless, communications, information and entertainment services a reality.

== Expected Market Growth ==
Analyst firm Yankee Group has forecasted that the market for real-time network based policy services will grow to more than $700 million by 2010. The top real time charging vendors include Telcordia, Alcatel and Ericsson.
