= Optiva =

Canadian telecommunications company

Optiva Inc.
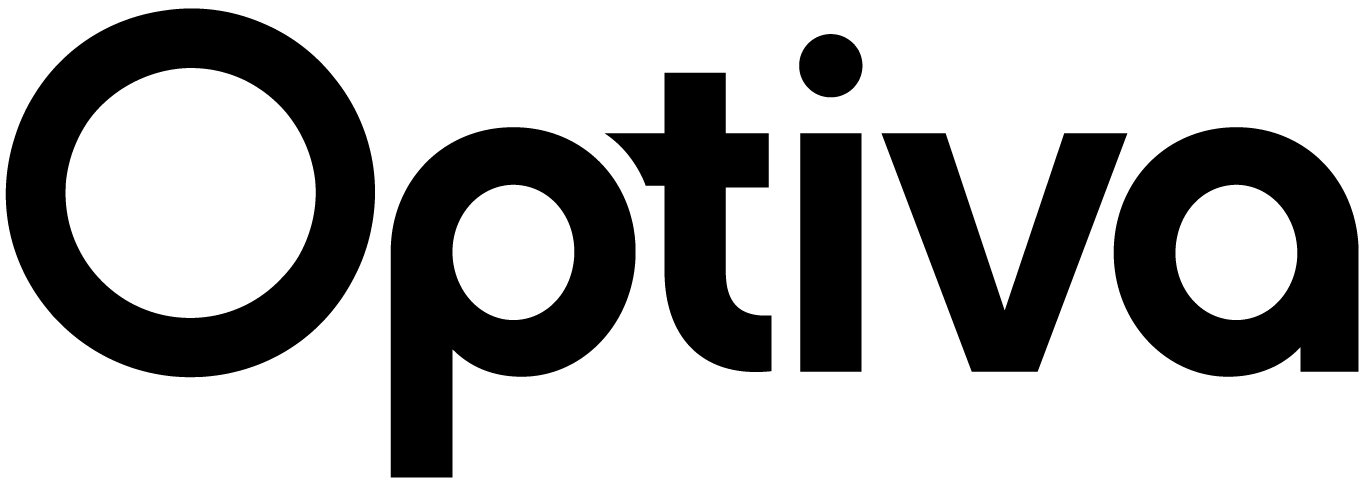
- Type: Public
- Traded as: TSX: OPT
- Industry: Telecommunications
- Headquarters: Toronto, Ontario, Canada
- Area served: Worldwide
- Key people: Robert Stabile (CEO); Michele Campriani (CRO); Matthew Halligan (CTO)
- Products: BSS, Charging, Partner Monetization available on private and public clouds
- Revenue: $100m (2019)
- Net income: $3m (2019)
- Owner: Qvantel
- Number of employees: >500
- Website: www.optiva.com

Optiva Inc. (formerly Redknee Solutions, Inc.) is a Canadian telecommunications company that provides business support systems through cloud computing.

== History ==
Optiva was founded in 1999 as Redknee Solutions by Lucas Skoczkowski and four other founders. After expanding into Europe the following year and opening R&D facilities in India in 2004, It was later listed on the London AIM Index in 2007 and on the Toronto Stock Exchange in 2008.

After taking control of the company in 2017, ESW Capital removed Skoczkowski as CEO, replacing him with Danielle Royston. In 2020, two years after being rebranded as Optiva, it made the decision to redeem its preferred shares, causing ESW to lose control and leading to Royston's resignation as CEO.

In August 2020, at the annual and special meeting, the shareholders approved to ratify the adoption of the company's shareholder rights plan and to approve the unallocated options available under the company's stock option plan. In December, John Giere was named president and CEO of Optiva.

In May 2024, Robert Stabile became Chairman and CEO of Optiva after serving as Chairman of its Board for seven years. On December 31, 2025, Qvantel completed the purchase of the firm.

== Acquisitions ==
Optiva grew substantially by acquisition.

- 2007 - Argent Networks for $4 million
- 2010 - Nimbus Systems for an undisclosed amount
- 2013 - Nokia Siemens Networks BSS division for $52 million
- 2015 - Orga Systems for EUR38 million

== Products ==
Optiva provides cloud native BSS, Charging and Partner Monetization software and services to the telecommunications industry. These include rating and charging, converged billing, customer experience management, interconnect billing and customer care. Its products address wireless, fixed line, satellite, WiMAX, MVNO, MVNE and broadband providers across the Americas, Europe, Asia Pacific, the Middle East and Africa.
