= William Thompson =

William Thompson may refer to:

== Academics ==
- William Forde Thompson (fl. 2000s–2020s), Canadian psychologist
- William Hepworth Thompson (1810–1886), English classical scholar
- William Gilman Thompson (1856–1927), American professor of medicine
- William Oxley Thompson (1855–1933), president of Ohio State University
- William Hertzog Thompson (1895–1981), American psychology professor and minister
- William Irwin Thompson (1938–2020), American social philosopher and cultural critic
- William Robert Thompson (1923/4–1979), Canadian psychologist and behavior geneticist
- William Y. Thompson (1922–2013), American historian

== Entertainment ==
- William Thompson (poet, born circa 1712) (1712–1766), English poet
- William C. Thompson (cinematographer) (1899–1963), American cinematographer
- William H. Thompson (actor), (1852–1923), American actor
- William Tappan Thompson (1812–1882), American humorist and journalist
- Will Lamartine Thompson (1847–1909), American composer
- Bill Thompson (talent manager) (William Carl Thompson, 1944–2015), American talent manager
- Bill Thompson (television host) (William Earnest Thompson, 1931–2014), American television host
- Bill Thompson (voice actor) (William H. Thompson, 1913–1971), American radio personality and voice actor

== Military ==
- William Thompson (general) (1736–1781), American Revolutionary War general
- William Thompson (Medal of Honor, 1861) (1812–1872), signal quartermaster in the American Civil War
- William P. Thompson (1844–1864), American Civil War recipient of the Medal of Honor
- William Francis Kynaston Thompson (1909–1980), British officer who fought and was captured at Arnhem
- William Thompson (admiral) (1922–2018), American admiral, chief of the U.S. Navy Memorial Foundation
- William Thompson (Medal of Honor, 1950) (1927–1950), Korean War recipient of the Medal of Honor
- Frank Thompson (SOE officer) (William Frank Thompson, 1920–1944), British officer who worked in Bulgaria in the Second World War
- James Thompson (VC) (William James Thompson, 1830–1891), English recipient of the Victoria Cross

== Politics ==
=== U.S. ===
- William Thompson (North Carolina politician) (1772–1802), member of the North Carolina General Assembly
- William B. Thompson (1797–?), Virginia farmer and politician
- William Thompson (Iowa politician) (1813–1897), representative from Iowa
- William C. Thompson (New York judge) (1924–2018), lawyer and state senator
- William F. Thompson (1852–?), representative from Florida
- William George Thompson (1830–1911), representative from Iowa
- William G. Thompson (1840–1904), mayor of Detroit
- William H. Thompson (Nebraska politician) (1853–1937), senator from Nebraska
- William I. S. Thompson (1936–1993), member of the Mississippi House of Representatives
- William Barlum Thompson (1860–1941), mayor of Detroit
- William T. Thompson (Nebraska politician) (1860–1939), Nebraska attorney general and solicitor of the US Treasury
- William Hale Thompson (1868–1944), mayor of Chicago
- William H. Thompson (Kansas politician) (1871–1928), senator from Kansas
- W. Lair Thompson (1880–1940), American politician and lawyer from the state of Oregon
- William Carrington Thompson (1915–2011), American politician and jurist from Virginia
- Bill Thompson (New York politician) (William Colridge Thompson Jr., born 1953), New York City comptroller and Democratic nominee for mayor of New York City
- Bill Thompson (Arkansas politician) (William Henry Thompson, 1915–1981), state legislator in Arkansas
- Bill Thompson (South Dakota politician) (William R. Thompson, born 1949)
- Bill Thompson (Wyoming politician) (William Leigh Thompson, 1937–2018)

=== U.K. ===
- William Thompson (1614–1681), English member of parliament for the City of London
- William Thompson (Ipswich MP) (1678–1739), English member of parliament for Ipswich
- William Thompson (died 1744) (c.1680–1744), British Whig politician, MP for Scarborough 1701–1722 and 1730–1744
- William Thompson (1792–1854), MP for Callington, London, Sunderland and Westmorland, also sheriff and lord mayor of London
- William Thompson (Ulster Unionist politician) (1939–2010), Northern Ireland politician

=== Elsewhere ===
- William Thompson (Upper Canada) (1786–1860)
- William Thompson (New South Wales politician) (1862–1937), Australian politician
- William Thompson (Australian politician) (1863–1953)
- William Murray Thompson (1841–1912), railway contractor and politician in Brisbane, Queensland, Australia
- William Adjei Thompson (1937–2025), Ghanaian soldier and politician

== Science ==
- William Thompson (naturalist) (1805–1852), Irish ornithologist and botanist
- William Thompson (viticulturist) (1816–1897), Englishman who developed the Thompson Seedless grape
- William Wardlaw Thompson (died 1917), South African ichthyologist and zoologist
- William Thompson (physician) (1861–1926), physician, registrar general for Ireland
- William A. Thompson (1864–1925), member of the U.S Army Corps of Engineers
- William Boyce Thompson (1869–1930), American mining engineer and financier
- William Robin Thompson (1887–1972), Canadian entomologist
- William Rae Thompson, American mathematician and statistician
- William Francis Thompson (biologist) (1888–1965), American ichthyologist
- William Lay Thompson (1930–2016), American ornithologist

== Sports ==
- William Thompson (boxer) (1811–1880), British prizefighter
- William Thompson (archer) (1848–1918), American archer
- William V. Thompson (1865–1938), American bowler
- William Thompson (cricketer, born 1866) (1866–1920), English cricketer
- William Thompson (cricketer, born 1882) (1882–1954), English cricketer
- William Thompson (Australian cricketer) (1891–?), Australian cricketer
- William Thompson (British Guiana cricketer) (1888–?), Guyanese cricketer
- William Thompson (rower) (1908–1956), American Olympic rower
- William Thompson (footballer) (1868–?), Scottish footballer
- William Thompson (skier) (1905–1994), Canadian Olympic skier
- Will Thompson (baseball) (1870–1962), American baseball player
- Willie Thompson (William Pringle Thompson 1867-1928), English footballer; see List of Newcastle United F.C. seasons
- Bill R. Thompson (William Robert Thompson, born 1949), Australian rules footballer
- Bill Thompson (American football) (William Allen Thompson, born 1946)
- Bill Thompson (Australian footballer) (William Hargreaves Thompson, 1876–1965), Australian rules footballer
- Bill Thompson (Scottish footballer) (William Gordon Thompson, 1921–1986)
- Bill Thompson (basketball) (William Thompson, 1920–1969), American basketball player
- Bill Thompson (footballer, born 1899) (William Potter Thompson, 1899–1959), English footballer
- Bill Thompson (footballer, born 1940) (William Thompson, 1940–2011), English footballer
- Bill Thompson (racing driver) (William Bethel Thompson, 1906–1945), Australian racing driver
- Billy Thompson (baseball) (William Penn Thompson, 1874–1960), American Negro league outfielder
- Billy Thompson (basketball) (William Stansbury Thompson, born 1963), American basketball player
- Billy Thompson (footballer, born 1886) (William Thompson, 1886–1933), English footballer
- Billy Thompson (referee) (William Henry Thompson, 1933–2021), British rugby league referee
- Billy Thompson (rugby league) (William Thompson, 1923–1992), Australian rugby league player
- Billy Thompson (soccer, born 1968) (William Thompson, born 1968), American soccer player
- Billy Thompson (soccer, born 1990) (William Aaron Thompson, born 1990), American soccer player

== Other ==
- William Thompson (banker) (fl. 1720s), governor of the Bank of England from 1725 to 1727
- William Thompson (horticulturist) (1823–1903), English horticulturist and nurseryman
- William Thompson (painter) (c. 1730–1800), Irish painter
- William Thompson (Methodist) (1733–1799), first president of the Methodist Conference after Wesley's death
- William Thompson (philosopher) (1775–1833), Irish political and philosophical writer and social reformer
- William Thompson (journalist) (1846–1934), American Indian fighter and newspaper editor
- William Clyde Thompson (1839–1912), leader of the Mount Tabor Indian Community in Texas
- William Thompson (bishop) (1885–1975), Anglican bishop of Persia (Iran)
- Bill Thompson (bishop) (William Avery Thompson, 1946–2020), Anglican bishop of the Diocese of Western Anglicans (U.S.)
- William Thompson (archdeacon of Cork) (1766–1833)
- William Thompson (archdeacon of Wellington) (fl. 1944–1954), Canadian Anglican priest
- William Paul Thompson (1937–1989), American serial killer
- William Thompson (aeronautics commissioner) (born 1951), pilot for Delta Air Lines, lawyer, and businessman
- William C. Thompson (Alabama judge) (born 1962), judge on the Alabama Court of Civil Appeals
- William Harvey Thompson (died 1927), prohibition enforcement agent in Seattle, Washington
- William Thompson (confidence man) (fl. 1840s), American criminal
- William S. Thompson (born 1969), American judge in West Virginia
- William Francis Thompson (philologist) (1810–1842), civil servant, magistrate and philologist
- William Thompson (1805–1866), also known as Wiremu Tamihana, Maori preacher
- Bill Thompson (technology writer) (William George Thompson, born 1960), English technology writer and technologist
- William Eastwood Thompson (c. 1868–1952), Australian settler of Phillip Island, Victoria, and philanthropist
- William Lee Thompson, American convicted murderer; see murder of Sally Ivester

== See also ==
- Bill Thompson (disambiguation)
- Billy Thompson (disambiguation)
- William Thomson (disambiguation)
- William H. Thompson (disambiguation)
- William Thompson House (disambiguation)
