= 1960–61 Newcastle United F.C. season =

Newcastle United
1960–61 season
- Chairman: Wally Hurford
- Manager: Charlie Mitten
- First Division: 21st (relegated)
- FA Cup: Quarter finals
- League Cup: First round
- Top goalscorer: League: White (28); All: White (29)
- Average home league attendance: 26,500
Home colours	Away colours

During the 1960–61 English football season, Newcastle United F.C. competed in the Football League First Division.

== Season summary ==
In the 1960–61 season, Newcastle were relegated after 13 years in the top flight after a season which saw the Magpies score an impressive 86 goals, but conceded a horrific 109 goals.

== Final league table ==
Pos	Team	Pld	W	D	L	GF	GA	GAv	Pts	Qualification or relegation
18	Bolton Wanderers	42	12	11	19	58	73	0.795	35	
19	Birmingham City	42	14	6	22	62	84	0.738	34	Qualification for the Inter-Cities Fairs Cup second round
20	Blackpool	42	12	9	21	68	73	0.932	33	
21	Newcastle United (R)	42	11	10	21	86	109	0.789	32	Relegation to the Second Division
22	Preston North End (R)	42	10	10	22	43	71	0.606	30	Relegation to the Second Division

Source: World Football
Rules for classification: 1) Points; 2) Goal average; 3) Goals scored
(R) Relegated

== Results ==
Newcastle United's score comes first

=== Legend ===
Win	Draw	Loss

=== Football League First Division ===
Date	Opponent	Venue	Result	Attendance	Scorers
20 August 1960	Preston North End	A	3–2	17,363	White (3)
24 August 1960	Fulham	H	7–2	23,498	Gilfillan (2), White, Neale (2), Tuohy (2)
27 August 1960	Burnley	H	0–1	35,485	
31 August 1960	Fulham	A	3–4	21,361	Allchurch, Hughes, Woods
3 September 1960	Nottingham Forest	A	2–0	23,806	Gibson, (own goal)
5 September 1960	West Bromwich Albion	A	0–6	22,661	
10 September 1960	Manchester City	H	1–3	25,904	Marshall
14 September 1960	West Bromwich Albion	H	3–2	16,107	Hughes, White, Tuohy
17 September 1960	Arsenal	A	0–5	34,885	
24 September 1960	Leicester City	H	1–3	21,161	McGuigan
1 October 1960	Cardiff City	H	5–0	17,627	Luke (2), White (2), Mitchell
8 October 1960	Aston Villa	A	0–2	25,336	
15 October 1960	Wolverhampton Wanderers	H	4–4	23,401	Hughes, White, Mitchell (2)
22 October 1960	Manchester United	A	2–3	37,516	Stokoe (pen), Hughes
29 October 1960	Tottenham Hotspur	H	3–4	51,369	Hughes, White (2)
5 November 1960	Chelsea	A	2–4	30,489	White (2)
12 November 1960	Blackpool	H	4–3	26,657	White (2), Neale (2)
19 November 1960	Everton	A	0–5	41,123	
26 November 1960	Blackburn Rovers	H	3–1	22,623	White (2), Mitchell
3 December 1960	Bolton Wanderers	A	1–2	12,921	White
10 December 1960	West Ham United	H	5–5	20,100	Bell, McGuigan, White (2), Mitchell
17 December 1960	Preston North End	H	0–0	21,514	
24 December 1960	Birmingham City	H	2–2	20,354	Mitchell, Scanlon
26 December 1960	Birmingham City	A	1–2	29,435	Woods
31 December 1960	Burnley	A	3–5	24,972	Hughes (2), White
14 January 1961	Nottingham Forest	H	2–2	25,845	White, Woods
21 January 1961	Manchester City	A	3–3	19,746	Allchurch, White, Woods
4 February 1961	Arsenal	H	3–3	34,394	Hughes, White, Scanlon
11 February 1961	Leicester City	A	3–5	26,449	Allchurch, White (2)
22 February 1961	Cardiff City	A	2–3	30,000	Allchurch, White
25 February 1961	Aston Villa	H	2–1	21,275	White (2)
8 March 1961	Wolverhampton Wanderers	A	1–2	24,970	Allchurch
11 March 1961	Manchester United	H	1–1	28,867	Scanlon
22 March 1961	Tottenham Hotspur	A	2–1	46,470	Allchurch, Scanlon
25 March 1961	Chelsea	H	1–6	28,975	Neale
31 March 1961	Sheffield Wednesday	H	0–1	42,181	
1 April 1961	West Ham United	A	1–1	17,103	Scanlon
3 April 1961	Sheffield Wednesday	A	1–1	35,273	Woods
8 April 1961	Everton	H	0–4	30,342	
15 April 1961	Blackpool	A	1–2	19,381	Woods
22 April 1961	Bolton Wanderers	H	4–1	18,820	McGuigan, Keith, McKinney (pen), Tuohy
29 April 1961	Blackburn Rovers	A	4–2	12,700	Allchurch, McGuigan (2), Neale

=== FA Cup ===
Round	Date	Opponent	Venue	Result	Attendance	Goalscorers
R3	7 January 1961	Fulham	H	5–0	36,037	Allchurch, Neale (3), Woods
R4	1 February 1961	Stockport County	H	4–0	48,715	Allchurch, White, Woods (2)
R5	18 February 1961	Stoke City	H	3–1	46,253	Allchurch, McKinney (pen), Scanlon
QF	4 March 1961	Sheffield United	H	1–3	54,829	McGuigan

=== League Cup ===
Round	Date	Opponent	Venue	Result	Attendance	Goalscorers
R1	10 October 1960	Colchester United	A	1–4	9,130	Neale

== Squad ==
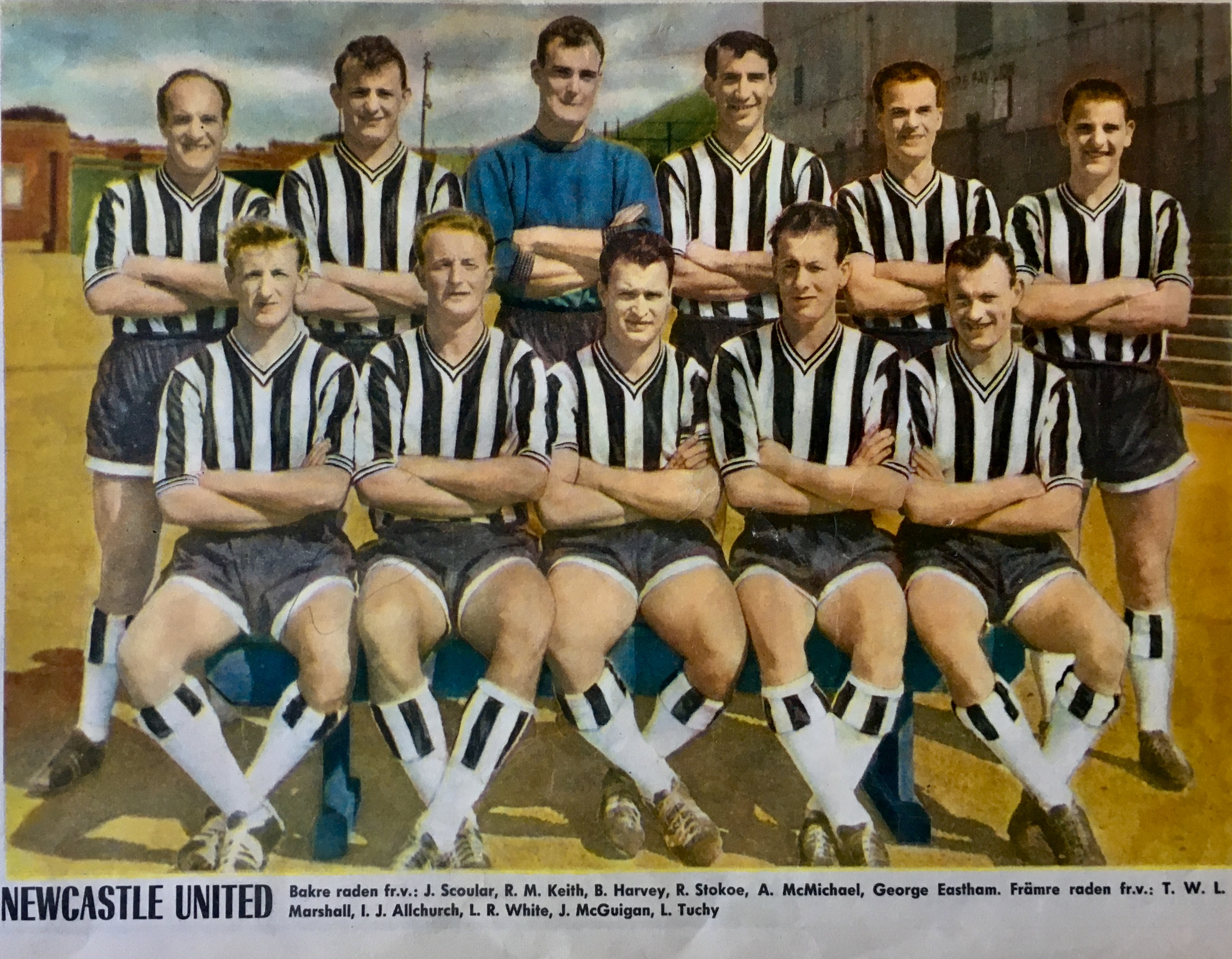
Newcastle squad in 1960: (back row): Scoular, Keith, Harvey, Stokoe, McMichael, Eastham. (front row): Marshall, Allchurch, White, McGuigan, Tuohy.

Note: Flags indicate national team as defined under FIFA eligibility rules; some limited exceptions apply. Players may hold more than one non-FIFA nationality.

Pos.	Nation	Player
GK	ENG	Bryan Harvey
DF	NIR	Dick Keith
DF	ENG	Bob Stokoe
DF	ENG	John McGrath
DF	NIR	Alf McMichael
MF	ENG	Duncan Neale
MF	ENG	Gordon Hughes
MF	ENG	Jackie Bell
FW	WAL	Ivor Allchurch
FW	ENG	Len White
FW	ENG	Charlie Woods
DF	ENG	Bill McKinney
MF	ENG	Albert Scanlon
GK	WAL	Dave Hollins
FW	SCO	John McGuigan
MF	SCO	Bobby Mitchell
MF	IRL	Liam Tuohy
MF	SCO	Jimmy Scoular

Pos.	Nation	Player
DF	ENG	George Heslop
GK	SCO	Stewart Mitchell
DF	ENG	Bill Thompson
MF	ENG	Brian Wright
FW	ENG	Ken Hodgson
DF	ENG	George Dalton
MF	ENG	George Luke
GK	SCO	Herbert Garrow
FW	SCO	James Harrower
MF	SCO	Jimmy Wilson
FW	SCO	Bobby Gilfillan
MF	ENG	Terry Marshall
MF	ENG	John Mitten
DF	ENG	Bobby Ferguson
FW	NIR	Jimmy Gibson
DF	ENG	Malcolm Scott
FW	ENG	Ken Hale
