= William Thomson =

William, Billy or Bill Thomson may refer to:

== Military ==
- William Thomson (American soldier) (1727–1796), American militia captain in Capture of Savannah
- William Taylour Thomson (1813–1883), British military officer and diplomat
- William Montgomerie Thomson (1877–1963), British general and commander of the British expeditionary force in north Persia
- William McKenzie Thomson (1898–1987), Canadian World War I pilot

== Politics ==
- William Alexander Thomson (1816–1878), Canadian author and politician
- William Thomson (politician) (1818–1866), member of parliament in Christchurch, New Zealand
- William Mitchell-Thomson, 1st Baron Selsdon (1877–1938), British politician

== Religion ==
- William Thomson (writer) (1746–1817), Scottish minister and historian
- William Aird Thomson (1773–1863), Scottish minister and antiquarian
- William McClure Thomson (1806–1894), American missionary and writer
- William Thomson (bishop) (1819–1890), Archbishop of York, 1862–1890
- William Burns Thomson (1821–1893), Scottish medical missionary

== Science ==
- William Thomson (mineralogist) (1760–1806), English physician and geologist
- William Thomson (physician) (1802–1852), Scottish author and professor of medicine
- William Thomson, 1st Baron Kelvin (1824–1907), Scots-Irish mathematician, physicist and engineer
- William Thomson (surgeon) (1843–1909), Irish surgeon
- William Johnston Thomson (1881–1949), Scottish engineer and businessman

== Sports ==
- William Thomson (Dumbarton footballer) (fl. 1891–1901), Scottish footballer (Dumbarton, Scotland)
- William Thomson (Dundee footballer) (1874–1917), Scottish footballer (Dundee, Bolton Wanderers, Scotland)
- William Thomson (rugby union) (1880–1942), Scottish international rugby union player
- William Thomson (rugby union, born 1876), Scottish international rugby union player
- Bill Thomson (cricketer) (1943–2019), New Zealand cricketer and hockey player
- Billy Thomson (footballer, born 1895), Scottish football wing half for Bristol Rovers and Leicester City
- Billy Thomson (footballer, born 1958) (1958–2023), Scottish goalkeeper for St Mirren, Dundee United, Motherwell, Dundee and Scotland
- Bill Thomson (ice hockey) (1914–1993), Canadian ice hockey player
- Willie Thomson (c. 1851–?), Scottish golfer

== Other ==
- William Thomson (artist) (1926–1988), British artist
- William Thomson (musicologist) (died 1753), Scottish folk song collector and singer
- William John Thomson (1771–1845), American artist
- W. H. Seward Thomson (1856–1932), U.S. federal judge
- William Thomson (mathematician) (1856–1947), Scottish mathematician
- William Thomas Thomson (actuary) (1813–1883), Scottish actuary
- William James Thomson (1857–1927), Canadian artist and engraver
- William Ennis Thomson (1927–2019), music school dean
- William Erskine Thomson (1875–1962), Scottish architect
- William Hanna Thomson (1833–1918), American physician and Christian writer
- William Thomson (silversmith) (1777–1833), American silversmith

== See also ==
- William Thompson (disambiguation)
