= Bill Thompson =

Bill Thompson may refer to:

== Politics ==
- William Hale Thompson (1868–1944), known as Big Bill Thompson, Mayor of Chicago
- Bill Thompson (Wyoming politician) (1937–2018), member of the Wyoming State House of Representatives
- Bill Thompson (South Dakota politician) (born 1949), South Dakota State House of Representatives
- Bill Thompson (New York politician) (born 1953), New York City Comptroller and Democratic nominee for mayor
- Bill Thompson (Ohio politician) (fl. 1980s–1990s), Ohio state representative
- Bill Thompson (Arkansas politician) (died 1981), Arkansas state representative

== Sports ==
- Bill Thompson (Australian footballer) (1876–1965), Australian rules footballer for Fitzroy
- Bill Thompson (racing driver) (1906–1945), 3-time winner of the Australian Grand Prix in the 1930s
- Bill Thompson (footballer, born 1899) (1899–1959), English footballer for Nottingham Forest
- Bill Thompson (Scottish footballer) (1921–1988), for Portsmouth and Bournemouth, manager in England and the Netherlands
- Bill Thompson (footballer, born 1940) (1940–2011), English footballer for Newcastle, Rotherham and Darlington
- Bill Thompson (American football) (born 1946), American football player
- Bill R. Thompson (born 1949), Australian rules footballer for Essendon
- Bill Thompson (basketball) (fl. 1941–1942), American professional basketball player
- Bill Thompson (badminton) (born 1956), Northern Irish badminton player

== Other ==
- Bill Thompson (talent manager) (1944–2015), of Jefferson Airplane and Jefferson Starship
- Bill Thompson (technology writer) (born 1960), UK technology writer
- Bill Thompson (television host) (1931–2014), creator and co-host of the children's television program The Wallace and Ladmo Show
- Bill Thompson (voice actor) (1913–1971), voice of Droopy Dog
- Bill Thompson (bishop) (1946–2020), Anglican bishop of the Diocese of Western Anglicans (U.S.)
- Bill Thompson III (1962–2019), editor of Bird Watcher's Digest
- William Forde Thompson (fl. 2000s–2020s), known as Bill Thompson, Canadian-Australian psychologist

== See also ==
- Billy Thompson (disambiguation)
- William Thompson (disambiguation)
