= Gethsemane =

Garden by Jerusalem's Mount of Olives

Coordinates: 31.779402°N 35.240197°E

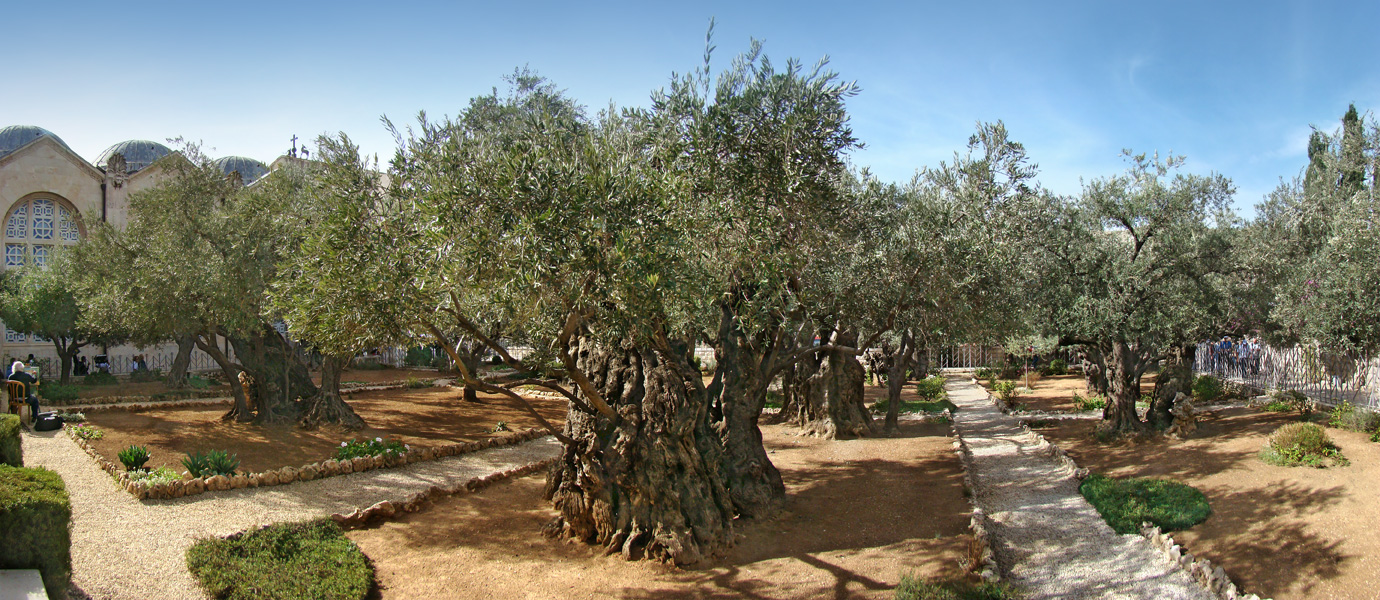
One of four adjacent olive groves near the foot of the Mount of Olives, traditionally considered to be Gethsemane

Gethsemane (/ɡɛθˈsɛməni/ gheth-SEM-ə-nee) (Note: Ancient Greek: Γεθσημανή, romanized: Gethsēmanḗ; Hebrew: גת שמנים, romanized: Gat Shmaním; Arabic: جثسيماني, romanized: Jathsaymānī; Classical Syriac: ܓܕܣܡܢ, romanized: Gaḏ Šmānê, lit. 'oil press'.) is a garden as well as a courtyard at the foot of the Mount of Olives in East Jerusalem, where, according to the four Gospels of the New Testament, Jesus Christ underwent the Agony in the Garden and was arrested before his crucifixion. The garden is a place of great resonance in Christianity. There are several small olive groves in church property, all adjacent to each other and identified with biblical Gethsemane.

== Etymology ==
Gethsemane appears in the Greek original of the Gospel of Matthew and the Gospel of Mark as Γεθσημανή (Gethsēmanḗ). The name is derived from the Aramaic ܓܕܣܡܢ (Gaḏ-Smān), or Hebrew גַּת שְׁמָנִים (gath shǝmānim) meaning 'oil press'. Matthew 26:36 and Mark 14:32 call it χωρίον (chōríon), meaning a place or estate. The Gospel of John says Jesus entered a garden (κῆπος, kêpos) with his disciples.

== Location ==
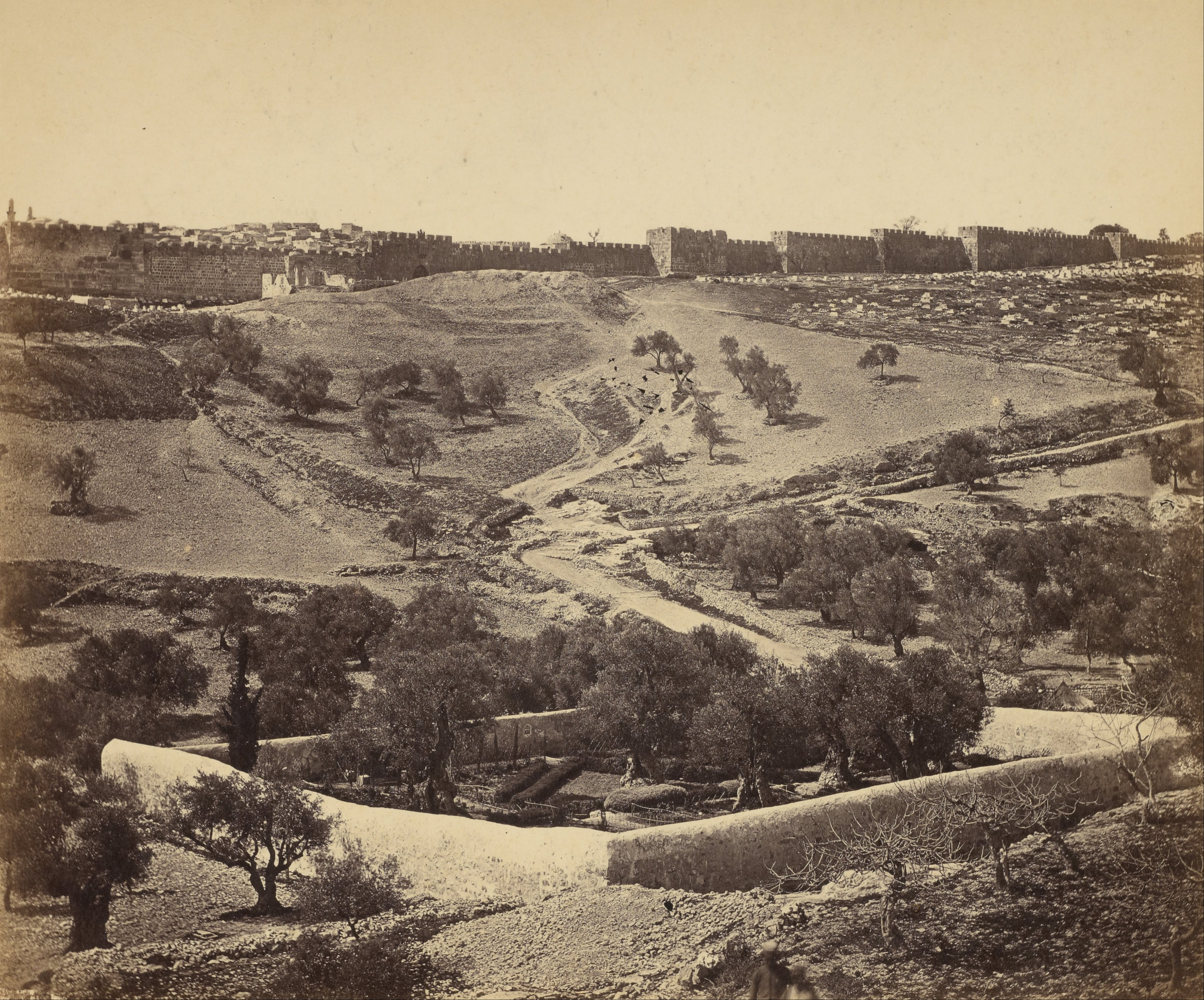
Garden of Gethsemane, The Cedron, 1857

According to the New Testament the garden was a place that Jesus and his disciples customarily visited, which allowed Judas Iscariot to find him on the night Jesus was arrested.

There are four locations, all of them at or near the western foot of the Mount of Olives, officially claimed by different denominations to be the place where Jesus prayed on the night he was betrayed:

1. The garden at the Catholic Church of All Nations, built over the "Rock of the Agony";
2. The location near the Tomb of the Virgin Mary to the north;
3. The Greek Orthodox location to the east;
4. The Russian Orthodox orchard, next to the Church of Mary Magdalene.

William McClure Thomson, in his The Land and the Book, first published in 1859, wrote: "When I first came to Jerusalem, and for many years afterward, this plot of ground was open to all whenever they chose to come and meditate beneath its very old olive trees. The Latins, however, have within the last few years succeeded in gaining sole possession, and have built a high wall around it. The Greeks have invented another site a little to the north of it. My own impression is that both are wrong. The position is too near the city, and so close to what must have always been the great thoroughfare eastward, that our Lord would scarcely have selected it for retirement on that dangerous and dismal night. I am inclined to place the garden in the secluded vale several hundred yards to the north-east of the present Gethsemane."

All of the foregoing is based on long-held tradition and the conflating of the synoptic accounts of Mark (14:31) and Matthew (26:36) with the Johannine account (John 18:1). Mark and Matthew record that Jesus went to "a place called the oil press (Gethsemane)" and John states he went to a garden near the Kidron Valley. Modern scholarship acknowledges that the exact location of Gethsemane is unknown.

== Pilgrimage site ==
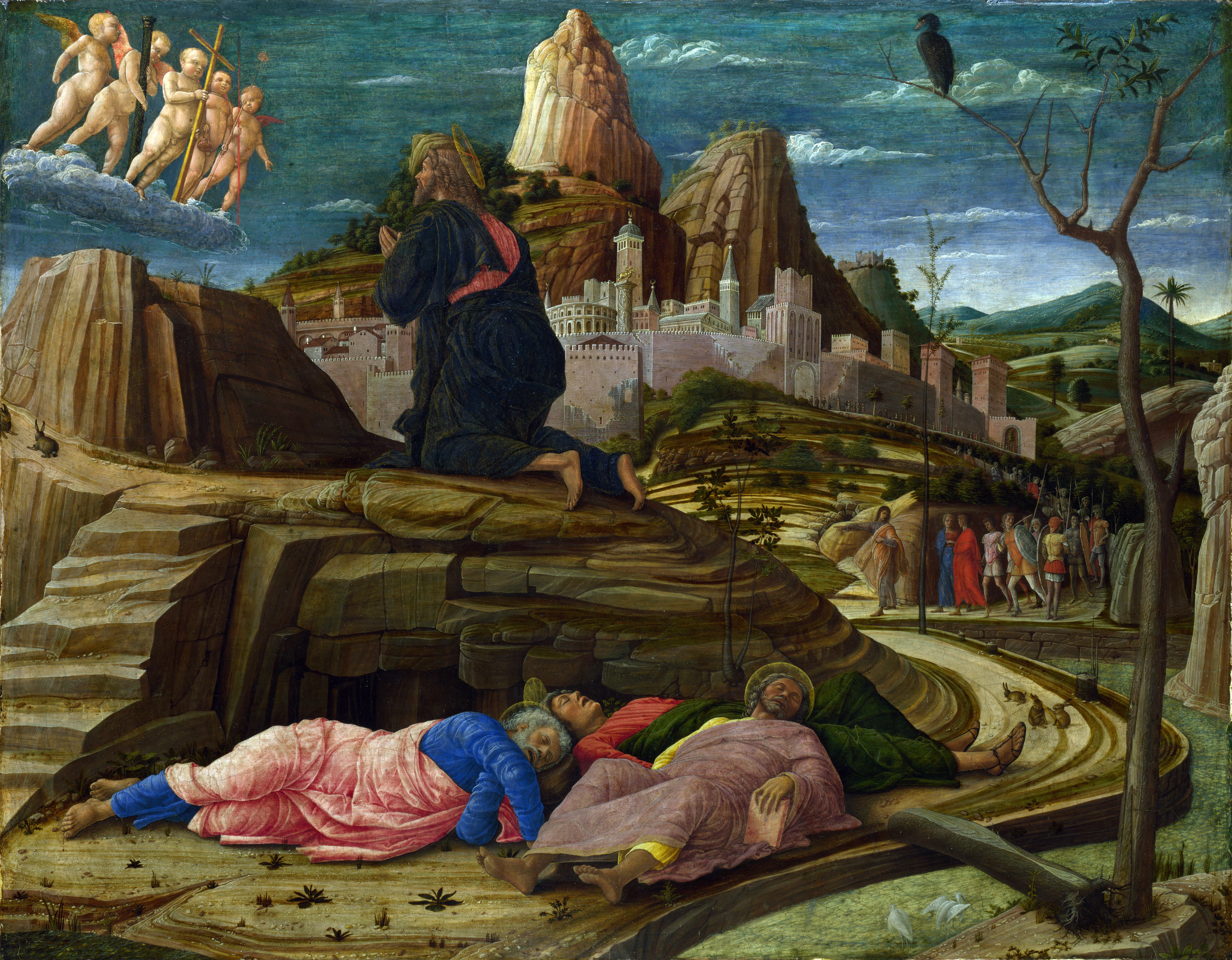
Andrea Mantegna's Agony in the Garden, c. 1460, depicts Jesus praying in the Gethsemane while the disciples sleep and Judas leads the mob.

=== Scriptural basis ===
According to Luke 22:43–44, Jesus' anguish on the Mount of Olives (Luke does not mention Gethsemane; Luke 22:39–40) was so deep that "He prayed more fervently, and he was in such agony of spirit that his sweat fell to the ground like great drops of blood."

=== Near the tomb of Mary ===
According to Eastern Orthodox Church tradition, Gethsemane is the garden where the Virgin Mary was buried and was assumed into heaven after her dormition on Mount Zion.

=== History ===
The Garden of Gethsemane became a focal site for early Christian pilgrims. It was visited in 333 by the anonymous "Pilgrim of Bordeaux", whose Itinerarium Burdigalense is the earliest description left by a Christian traveler in the Holy Land. In his Onomasticon, Eusebius of Caesarea notes the site of Gethsemane located "at the foot of the Mount of Olives", and he adds that "the faithful were accustomed to go there to pray".

Eight ancient olive trees growing in the Latin site of the garden may be 900 years old (see § Age of the olive trees).

In 1681, Croatian knights of the Holy Order of Jerusalem, Paul, Antun and James bought the Gethsemane Garden and donated it to the Franciscan community, which owns it to this day. A three-dimensional plate on the right side next to the entrance to the garden describes the aforementioned gift to the community.

== Age of the olive trees ==
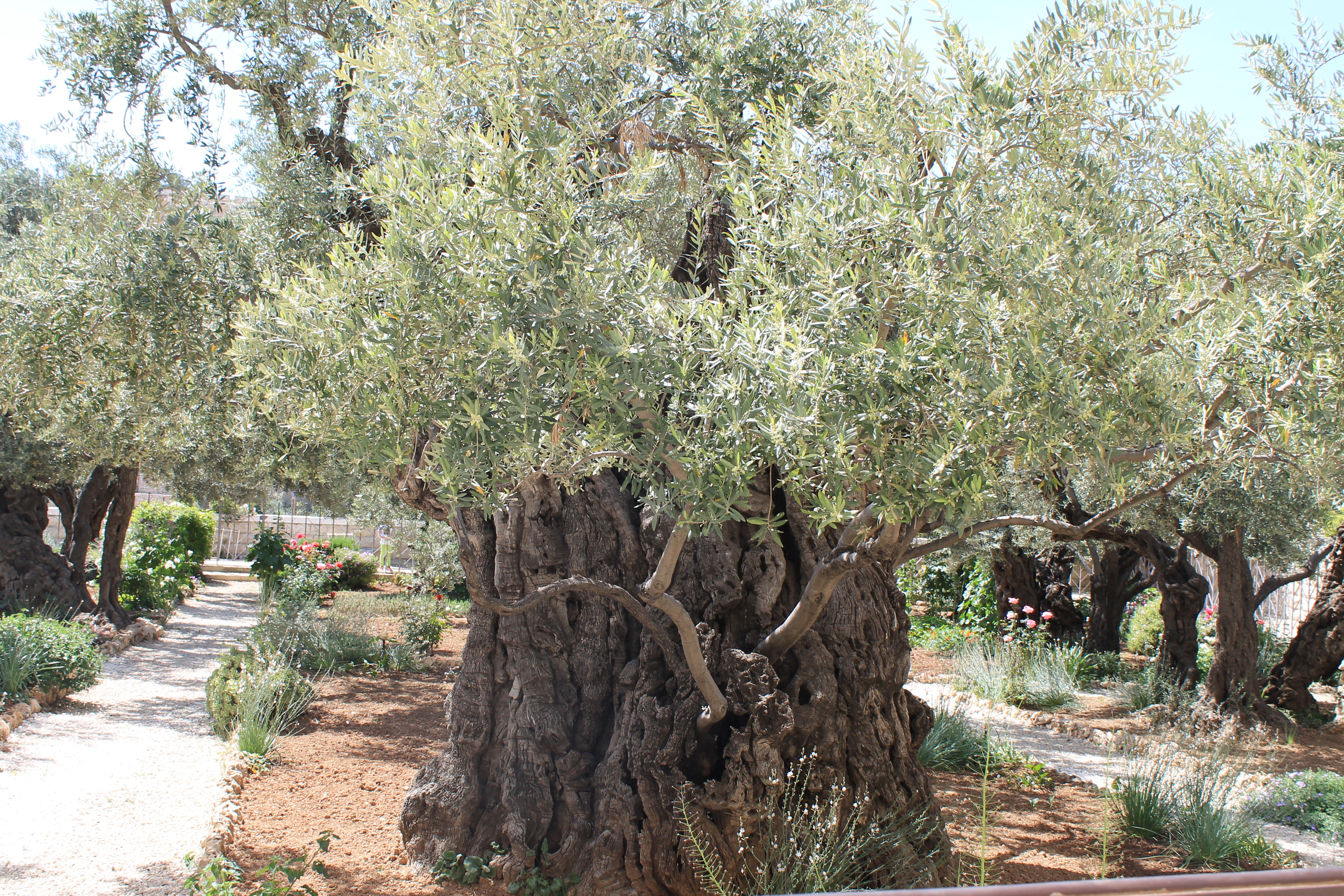
One of the oldest olive trees in the garden

A study conducted by the Italian National Research Council (CNR) in 2012 found that three of the olive trees in the garden are amongst the oldest known to science. Dates of AD 1092, 1166 and 1198 were obtained by carbon dating from older parts of the trunks of three trees. DNA tests show that the trees were originally planted from the same parent plant. This could indicate an attempt to keep the lineage of an older individual intact. Possibly, the three trees tested could have been sprouts reviving from the older roots. According to the researchers, "The results of tests on trees in the Garden of Gethsemane have not settled the question of whether the gnarled trees are the very same which sheltered Jesus because olive trees can grow back from roots after being cut down".

However, Mauro Bernabei, author of the paper published as a result of the CNR study, writes: "All the tree trunks are hollow inside so that the central, older wood is missing [...] In the end, only three from a total of eight olive trees could be successfully dated. The dated ancient olive trees do, however, not allow any hypothesis to be made with regard to the age of the remaining five giant olives [sic]."

== Archaeology ==
In 1956, Franciscan archaeologist Virgilio Corbo excavated at the Gethsemane Grotto, finding evidence that the site functioned as an agricultural facility used for the production of olive oil in the late Second Temple period. This accords with the etymology of the placename Gethsemane which means "oil press".

In 2014, an archaeological survey of the site was conducted by Amit Re'em and David Yeger on behalf of the Israel Antiquities Authority (IAA). In December 2020, archaeologists revealed the remains of a 1,500-year-old Byzantine church (known as the Church of All Nations) and the foundations of a Second Temple-era ritual bath (also known as a mikveh). According to Dr. Leah and Dr. Rosario, Greek inscriptions were written on the church's floor as: "for the memory and repose of the lovers of Christ... accept the offering of your servants and give them remission of sins".

According to Israel Antiquities Authority's Jerusalem district head Amit Re'em, the uniqueness of the mikveh is that it is the first archaeological evidence at the site of Gethsemane where Christians have made pilgrimages for centuries.

In March 2025, scholars from Sapienza University of Rome announced the discovery of organic remains of vines and olive trees dating back 2,000 years ago, located in the north aisle of the Holy Sepulchre. This discovery confirms the presence of an ancient garden similar to the one described in the Gospels.

== See also ==
- Abbey of Our Lady of Gethsemani
- Agony in the Garden
- Holy Hour
