= Bellows Falls Sulphites =

- 1911; Bellows Falls, Vermont

Minor league affiliations
- Class: Class D (1911)
- League: Twin States League (1911)

Major league affiliations
- Team: None

Minor league titles
- League titles (0): None

Team data
- Name: Bellows Falls Sulphites (1911)
- Ballpark: Barber Park (1911)

The Bellows Falls Sulphites were a minor league baseball team based in Bellows Falls, Vermont in 1911. The Sulphites were charter members of the Class D level Twin States League and placed third in the league's only season of minor league play. Bellows Falls hosted home minor league games at Barber Park.

== History ==
The Bellows Falls Sulphites were formed in 1911, as the result of a business venture in nearby Brattleboro, Vermont. A team in Brattleboro was formed, with that team becoming the flagship franchise of the Twin State League. Brattleboro, Vermont businessmen George Fox and Michael Moran purchased property on the Island Park island and formed the Island Park Amusement Company. The company constructed a new amusement park on the island, which was located on the Connecticut River. The amusement park contained a new 1,200 seat ballpark. The amusement park venture and the ballpark were named "Island Park." The location was strategic. Because Vermont's Blue Laws in the era did not allow businesses to be open on Sundays, the official New Hampshire location of the island provided an escape from the legal issue.

With the new ballpark on Island Park, the owners aspired to host a team in the venue. After Local financial support formed the Brattleboro Islanders team, they needed opponents to play and three other league cities were recruited and franchises developed, including the Bellows Falls "Sulphites."

The "Sulphites" nickname corresponds to local Bellows Falls industry in the era.

The Twin States League was officially formed on March 12, 1911. The Twin States League began play as a four–team Class D level minor league. Brattleboro and the Bellows Falls Sulphites were joined by the Keene Medics and Springfield–Charlestown Hyphens as charter members.

Bellow Falls and the Twin States League schedule ran from July 1, 1911 to September 4, 1911, with league teams playing a 36–game schedule. Hank Shea was the Bellows Falls manager.

The Bellows Falls Sulphites and the league were integrated, among the first 20th century professional leagues to be integrated. Billy Thompson, a former negro leagues player, played for Bellow Falls, before a hand injury ended his season with Thompson hitting .288. The Bellows Falls Times local paper ran a front page tribute to Thompson after the injury ended his season.

The Sulphites and Islanders played in the opening day game at Island Park. In pre–game ceremonies, the Brattleboro and Bellows Falls players marched behind a band from the Brattleboro town hall, down Main Street, across the bridge and into the ballpark. The Islanders defeated Bellows Falls the opening day game 8–3, with 1,200 in attendance.

In the final Twin States League standings, Bellow Falls placed third. The first place Battleboro Islanders finished 6.5 games ahead of third place Bellows Falls. Overall, the Brattleboro Islanders (22–14) were followed by the Keene Medics (20–16), Bellows Falls Sulphites (15–20) and Springfield-Charlestown Hyphens (14–21) in the official standings of the four–team league.

After the 1911 season, the Twin States League was no longer a minor league baseball league. The league continued play in 1912 as a semi–pro league, with Bellows Falls remaining play as a member.

== The ballpark ==
The Bellows Falls Sulphites played 1911 home games at Barber Park as shown in a team photo from June 10, 1911. The Barber Park site became home to the Bellows Falls Country Club in 1922 after the property was sold and repurposed. Today, the location of the Bellows Falls Country Club is 12 Country Club Road, Bellows Falls, Vermont.

While the Brattleboro Islanders played 1911 home games at Island Park, the venue may have hosted the other league teams, given the construction size of the ballpark and the motivation of forming the league.

== Year–by–year record ==
| Year | Record | Finish | Manager | Notes |
|---|---|---|---|---|
| 1911 | 15–20 | 3rd | Hank Shea | No playoffs held |

== Notable alumni ==
- Billy Thompson (1911)

The complete player roster for the 1911 Bellows Falls Sulphites is unknown.
