= Billy Thompson =

Billy Thompson may refer to:

- Billy Thompson (baseball) (1874–1960), American baseball player
- Billy Thompson (basketball) (born 1963), American basketball player
- Billy Thompson (boxer) (1923–2009), British and European champion lightweight boxer
- Billy Thompson (footballer, born 1886) (1886–1933), English footballer
- Billy Thompson (gunman) (1845–1897), Old West gunman and gambler
- Billy Thompson (ice hockey) (born 1982), Canadian hockey player
- Billy Thompson (soccer, born 1968), American soccer player
- Billy Thompson (soccer, born 1990), American soccer player
- Billy Thompson (American football) (born 1946), American football player
- Billy Thompson (referee) (1933–2021), English rugby league referee
- Billy Thompson (rugby league), Australian rugby league player

== Fictional characters ==
- Billy Thompson, the main character in the UK cartoon strip Billy the Fish

== See also ==
- Billy Thomson (disambiguation)
- Bill Thompson (disambiguation)
- William Thompson (disambiguation)
