= William H. Thompson =

William H. Thompson may refer to:

- William Hepworth Thompson (1810–1886), English classical scholar and Master of Trinity College, Cambridge
- William Henry Thompson (1853–1937), U.S. senator from Nebraska
- William Howard Thompson (1871–1928), U.S. senator from Kansas
- William Hale Thompson (1868–1944), mayor of Chicago
- William Harvey Thompson (died 1927), prohibition enforcement agent in the Seattle, Washington
- William H. Thompson (actor) (1852–1923), Scottish-born actor
- William Thompson (Medal of Honor, 1950) (1927–1950), Korean War recipient of the Medal of Honor
- Bill Thompson (Arkansas politician) (died 1981), a state legislator in Arkansas

== See also ==
- William Thompson (disambiguation)
