= Springfield-Charlestown Hyphens =

Springfield–Charlestown Hyphens
- 1911; Charlestown, New Hampshire

Minor league affiliations
- Class: Class D (1911)
- League: Twin States League (1911)

Major league affiliations
- Team: None

Minor league titles
- League titles (0): None

Team data
- Name: Springfield–Charlestown Hyphens (1911)
- Ballpark: Unknown (1911)

The Springfield–Charlestown Hyphens were a minor league baseball team representing the partner cities of Springfield, Vermont and Charlestown, New Hampshire.

In, 1911, the Hyphens played as charter members of the Class D level Twin States League and placed fourth in the league's only season of minor league play.

== History ==
The Springfield–Charlestown Hyphens were formed in 1911, as the result of a business venture in nearby Brattleboro, Vermont and the strength of the partnership between Springfield and Charlestown. A team in Brattleboro was formed, as the flagship franchise of the Twin States League. Brattleboro, Vermont businessmen George Fox and Michael Moran had purchased property on the Island Park island and formed the Island Park Amusement Company. The company constructed a new amusement park on the island, which was located on the Connecticut River. The amusement park contained a new 1,200 seat ballpark. The amusement park venture and the ballpark were named "Island Park." The location was strategic for public events. Because Vermont's Blue Laws in the era did not allow businesses to be open on Sundays, the official New Hampshire location of the island provided an escape from the legal issue on weekends.

With the new ballpark on Island Park, the owners aspired to host a team in the venue. After Local financial support formed the Brattleboro Islanders team, they needed opponents to play and three other league cities were recruited and franchises developed, including the Springfield–Charlestown Hyphens franchise.

The Twin States League was officially formed on March 12, 1911. The Twin States League formed as a four–team Class D level minor league. Springfield–Charlestown joined the Brattleboro Islanders, Bellows Falls Sulphites and Keene Champs in forming the new league.

The Springfield–Charlestown and Twin States League schedule ran from July 1, 1911 to September 4, 1911, with league teams playing a 36–game schedule.

In the final Twin States League standings, the Hyphens finished in last place, playing the season under managers Warren Potter and Lawrence Grown. The first place Battleboro Islanders finished 8.5 games ahead of the fourth place Springfield–Charlestown Hyphens.

Overall, the Brattleboro Islanders (22–14) were followed closely by Keene, who finished with a final record of 20–16. The Bellows Falls Sulphites (15–20) and Springfield-Charlestown Hyphens (14–21) followed in the official standings of the four–team league.

After the 1911 season, the Twin States League was no longer a minor league baseball league. The league continued play in 1912 as a semi–pro league, without the Hypens remaining as a member.

== The ballpark ==
The name and location of the home ballpark for the 1911 Springfield–Charlestown Hyphens is not directly referenced. While the Brattleboro Islanders played 1911 home games at Island Park, the venue may have hosted the other league teams, given the construction size of the ballpark and the motivation of forming the league.

== Year–by–year record ==
| Year | Record | Finish | Manager | Notes |
|---|---|---|---|---|
| 1911 | 14–21 | 4th | Warren Potter / Lawrence Grown | No playoffs held |

== Notable alumni ==
The complete player roster for the 1911 Springfield–Charlestown Hyphens is unknown.
