= Twin States League =

- Classification: Class D (1911)
- Sport: Minor League Baseball
- First season: 1911
- Folded: 1911
- President: Major F. M. Keys (1911)
- No. of teams: 4
- Country: United States of America
- Most titles: 1 Brattleboro Islanders (1911)

The Twin States League was a minor league baseball league that played in the 1911 season. The four Class D level league franchises were located in Vermont and New Hampshire. The Brattleboro Islanders were the flagship franchise of the league and won the 1911 championship in the league's only season of minor league play. The Twin States League was integrated, among the first 20th century professional leagues to be integrated.

== History ==
The Twin States League was formed after Brattleboro, Vermont, businessmen George Fox and Michael Moran formed the Island Park Amusement Company. The company constructed a new amusement park on an island in the Connecticut River. The amusement park contained a new 1,200 seat ballpark. The amusement park venture and the ballpark were called "Island Park". Vermont's blue laws in the era did not allow businesses to be open on Sundays, and the official New Hampshire location of Island Park provided an escape from the legal issue.

After support for a team in the new ballpark in Brattleboro was secured, the three other league cities were recruited and franchises developed. The league officially formed on March 12, 1911. The meeting was held at the Rockingham Hotel in Bellows Falls, Vermont.

The Twin States League formed as a Class D level league. The Bellows Falls Sulphites, Brattleboro Islanders, Keene Medics and Springfield–Charlestown Hyphens became the charter members.

The Twin States League schedule ran from July 1, 1911, to September 4, 1911, with teams playing a 36–game schedule.

On opening day at Island Park, the Brattleboro and visiting Bellow Falls teams marched behind a band from the town hall, across the bridge to the ballpark. Brattleboro won the opening day game 8–3.

On the final day of the season, Brattleboro defeated Keene 2–0 to clinch the Twin States League championship.

In the final standings, Brattleboro won the championship by 2 1/2 games. The Brattleboro Islanders (22–14) were followed by the Keene Medics (20–16), Bellows Falls Sulphites (15–20) and Springfield-Charlestown Hyphens (14–21) in the standings of the four–team league.

Major F.M. Keys served as president of the league. Tim Horan, of the league champion Brattleboro Islanders, hit .300 to lead the league.

The league was integrated, among the first 20th century professional leagues to be integrated. Billy Thompson, former negro leagues player, played for Bellow Falls, before a hand injury ended his season.

After the 1911 season, the Twin States League was no longer a minor league baseball league. The league did continue play as a semi–pro league.

== Cities represented ==
- Bellows Falls, VT: Bellows Falls Sulphites 1911
- Brattleboro, VT: Brattleboro Islanders 1911
- Keene, NH: Keene Champs 1911
- Springfield, VT and Charlestown, NH: Springfield-Charlestown Hyphens 1911

== Standings ==
1911 Twin States League
| Team | W | L | GB | Pct. | Manager |
|---|---|---|---|---|---|
| Brattleboro Islanders | 22 | 14 | .611 | - | E. L. Breckinridge |
| Keene Champs | 20 | 16 | .556 | 2 | Tom Leonard |
| Bellows Falls Sulphites | 15 | 20 | .428 | 6½ | Hank Shea |
| Springfield-Charlestown Hyphens | 14 | 21 | .388 | 7½ | Warren Potter / Larry Grow |
