= Keene Champs =

- 1911; Keene, New Hampshire

Minor league affiliations
- Class: Class D (1911)
- League: Twin States League (1911)

Major league affiliations
- Team: None

Minor league titles
- League titles (0): None

Team data
- Name: Keene Champs (1911)
- Ballpark: Unknown (1911)

The Keene Champs were a minor league baseball team based in Keene, New Hampshire. In 1911, the Champs played as charter members of the Class D level Twin States League and placed second in the league's only season of minor league play.

== History ==
The Keene "Champs" were formed in 1911, as the result of a business venture in nearby Brattleboro, Vermont and the strength of a committee formed in Keene. A team in Brattleboro was formed, with that team becoming the flagship franchise of the Twin States League. Brattleboro, Vermont businessmen George Fox and Michael Moran purchased property on the Island Park island and formed the Island Park Amusement Company. The company constructed a new amusement park on the island, which was located on the Connecticut River. The amusement park contained a new 1,200 seat ballpark. The amusement park venture and the ballpark were named "Island Park." The location was strategic. Because Vermont's Blue Laws in the era did not allow businesses to be open on Sundays, the official New Hampshire location of the island provided an escape from the legal issue.

With the new ballpark on Island Park, the owners aspired to host a team in the venue. After Local financial support formed the Brattleboro Islanders team, they needed opponents to play and three other league cities were recruited and franchises developed, including the Keene franchise.

The Twin States League was officially formed on March 12, 1911. The Twin States League formed as a four–team Class D level minor league. Keene joined the Brattleboro Islanders, Bellows Falls Sulphites and Springfield–Charlestown Hyphens in forming the new league.

The Keene Champs and the Twin States League schedule ran from July 1, 1911, to September 4, 1911, with league teams playing a 36–game schedule. Thomas Leonard served as the Keene manager. The Keene team was also referred to as the "Medics" in some references.

On July 4, 1911, Keene swept a home doubleheader from the Brattleboro Islanders by scores of 12–3 and 1–5. On July 26, 1911, Keene again defeated Brattleboro, winning 1–0. On September 4, 1911, after winning four of seven games against Keene since the July 26, loss, Brattleboro hosted Keene on the final day of the season with a 1–game lead in the standings. The game meant the outright league championship if Brattleboro won and a tie if Keene won. More than 500 Keene fans made the trip for the final game, after a special train had been dispatched from Keene. With 3,500 total in attendance, Brattleboro won the clinching game at home by the score of 2–0.

In the final Twin States League standings, Keene placed second. The first place Battleboro Islanders finished 2.0 games ahead of Keene. Overall, the Brattleboro Islanders (22–14) were followed by Keene, who finished with a final record of 20–16. The Bellows Falls Sulphites (15–20) and Springfield-Charlestown Hyphens (14–21) followed in the official standings of the four–team league.

After the 1911 season, the Twin States League was no longer a minor league baseball league. The league continued play in 1912 as a semi–pro league, with Keene remaining as a member.

== The ballpark ==
The name for the home ballpark for the 1911 Keene Champs is not directly referenced. While the Brattleboro Islanders played 1911 home games at Island Park, the venue may have hosted the other league teams, given the construction size of the ballpark and the motivation of forming the league.

== Year–by–year record ==
Year	Record	Finish	Manager	Notes
1911	20–16	2nd	Thomas Leonard	No playoffs held

== Notable alumni ==
The complete player roster for the 1911 Keene Champs is unknown.
