= Norma Thompson =

American state legislator

Norma C. Thompson (March 21, 1916 – March 16, 2001) was an American state legislator in Arkansas. She was a member of the Arkansas House of Representatives in 1981 and 1982. She succeeded her deceased husband William H. "Bill" Thompson.
