= The Land and the Book =

1859 travelogue by William McClure Thomson

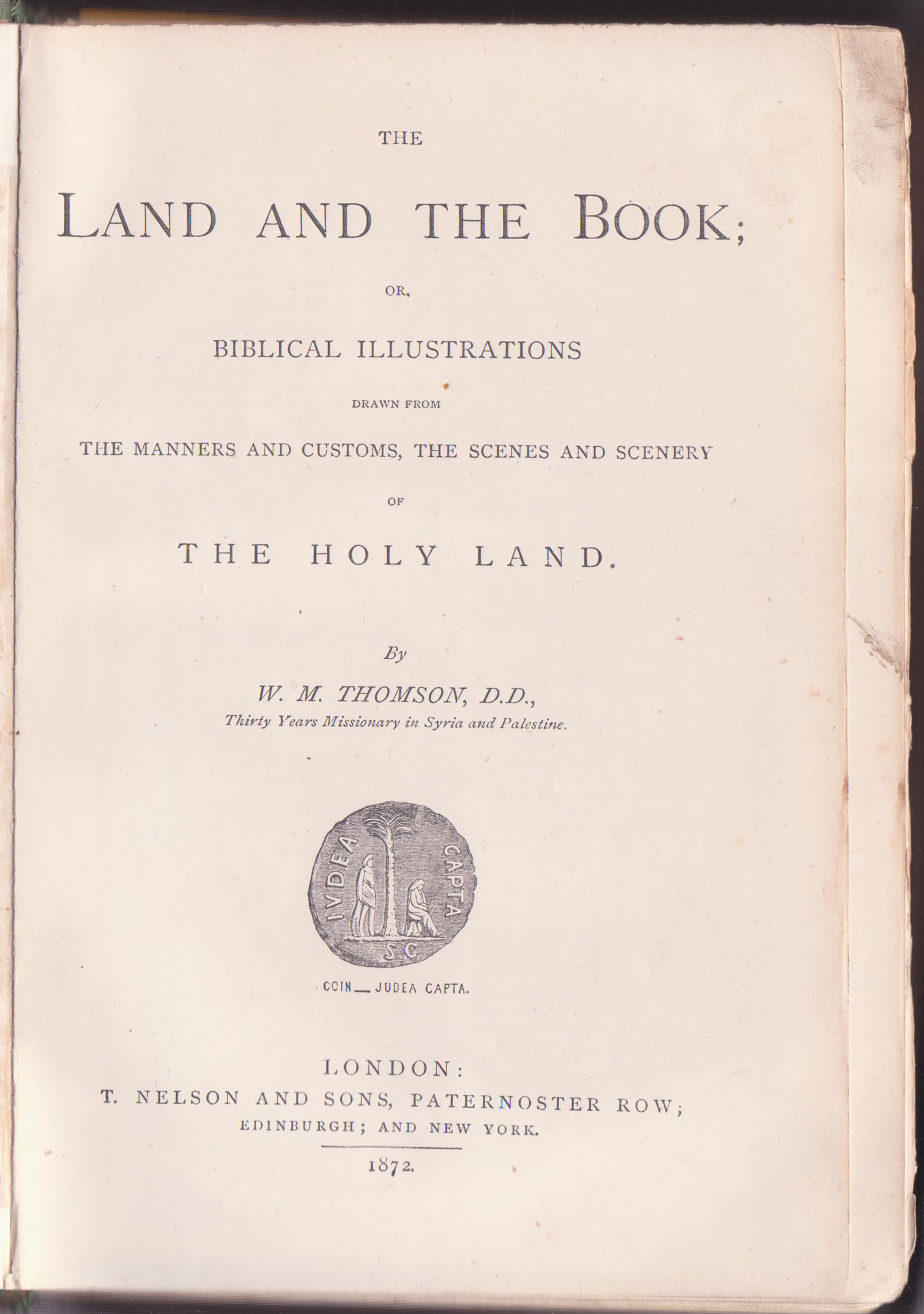
- Title page
- Author: William McClure Thomson
- Illustrator: William Hanna Thomson
- Language: English
- Genre: Travel literature
- Publisher: Harper & Brothers
- Publication date: 1859
- Publication place: United States

The Land and the Book; Or, Biblical Illustrations Drawn from the Manners and Customs, the Scenes and Scenery of the Holy Land is a 19th-century travelogue of Palestine and biblical travel narrative by the American Protestant missionary William McClure Thomson. First published in 1859, the work combines travel description, ethnographic observation, and biblical commentary based on Thomson’s travels in Ottoman-era Syria and Palestine. Written for a broad lay audience rather than academic specialists, it was one of the most widely read English-language books about the Holy Land in the latter half of the 19th century.

The book was published in two volumes, with more than 1,100 pages and 200 illustrations. It sold more than 200,000 copies.

== Structure and journey ==
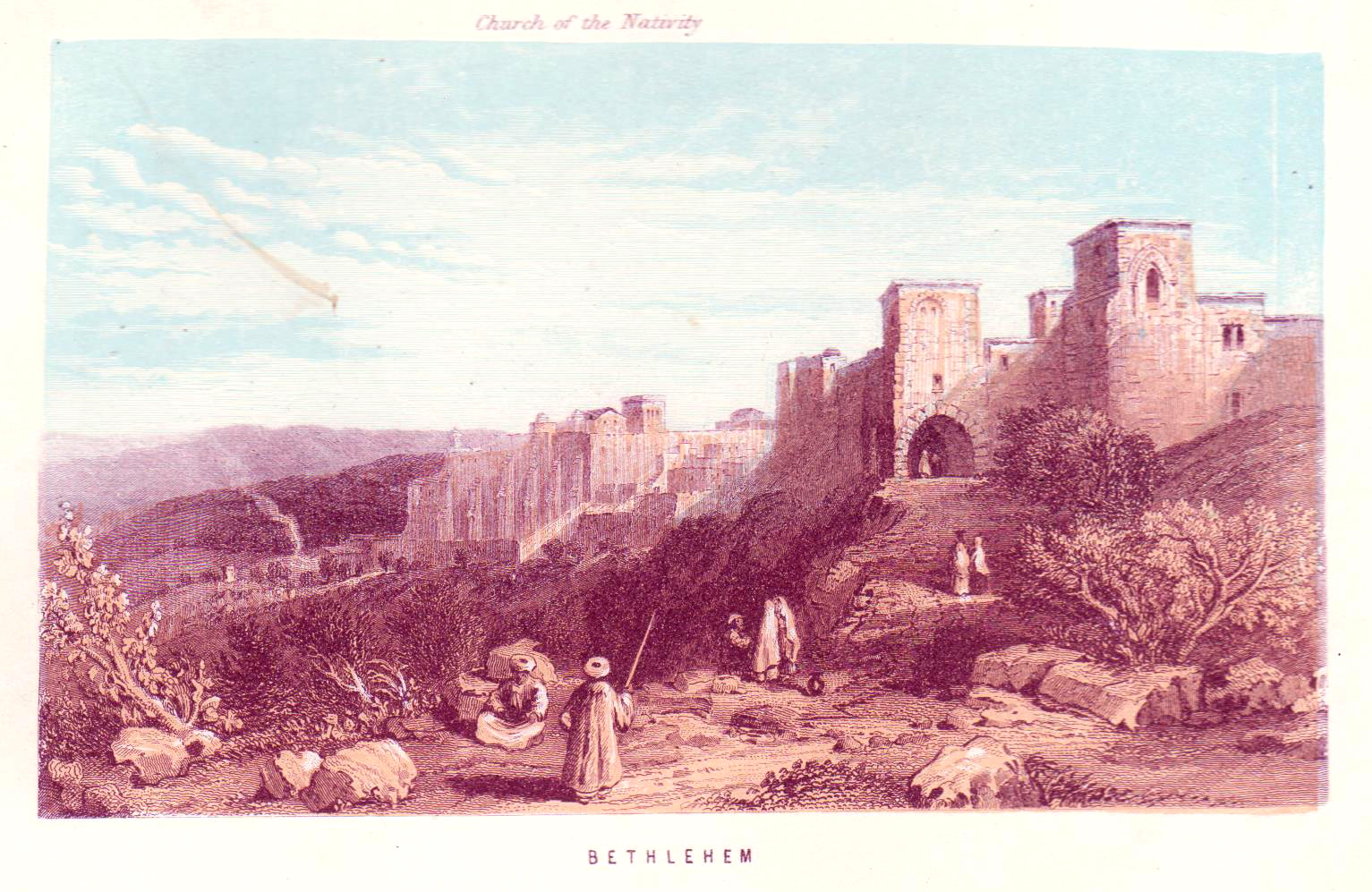
Frontispiece from an 1872 edition of Land and the Book – Bethlehem.

The book is framed as a pilgrimage narrative, structured around a fictionalized journey undertaken in 1857 with an unnamed companion whose questions prompt explanation and reflection. The route described begins in Beirut, journeys south along the Mediterranean coast to Sidon and Tyre, then inland through the Hula Valley and the region of Galilee. From there Thomson’s narrative moves through sites such as Safed, Tiberias, Nazareth, and Jenin, returning to the coast at Caesarea Maritima and continuing south via Jaffa, Ashdod, and Gaza. The journey turns inland again to visit Bayt Jibrin, Hebron, Bethlehem, and concludes in Jerusalem.

The book weaves scriptural exposition into descriptions of landscape and daily life, using local customs, flora, and physical geography as illustrations of biblical metaphors or episodes. Thomson’s account often assumes a continuity between contemporary practices and ancient biblical contexts, a framework that scholars later identified as shaping Western perceptions of the Holy Land.

The narrative includes accounts of events such as Thomson’s arrival in Safed shortly after the 1837 Galilee earthquake and his presiding over the funeral of Lady Hester Stanhope.

Many of the book’s illustrations were executed by his son, William Hanna Thomson, and helped popularize visual images of the region among American and British audiences.

== Reception and influence ==
Upon publication, The Land and the Book quickly became popular in both the United States and Britain. In the U.S. it was reportedly second in sales among nonfiction works about the Holy Land only to Uncle Tom’s Cabin during the latter half of the 19th century.

The work influenced various travelers and writers who followed, including the naturalist Henry Baker Tristram, who used Thomson’s book during his own explorations of Palestine, and the novelist H. Rider Haggard, whose A Winter Pilgrimage retraced a similar itinerary.

Scholars have observed that its popularity helped shape American Protestant views of the Middle East, blending missionary interests, biblical literalism, and travel narrative in ways that influenced subsequent writing about the “Bible lands.”

== Editions ==
- The Land and the Book: Volume 1. Vol. 2. Harper. 1859.
- The Land and the Book: Volume 2. The Land and the Book. Vol. 2. Harper. 1859.
- New York 1868
- London 1872, 1874, 1879
- The Land and the Book: Southern Palestine and Jerusalem. Harper. 1880.
- The Land and the Book: Central Palestine and Phoenicia. Harper. 1882.
- The Land and the Book: Lebanon, Damascus and Beyond Jordan. Harper. 1886.
- London, New York 1910
- London 1905 and 1954 (reprint London 1879)
- 1911 (reprint 2004)
