= William Thompson (painter) =

Irish portrait painter

- Born: c. 1730; Dublin, Ireland
- Died: 1800; London, England
- Occupation: Portrait painter

William Thompson (c. 1730 – 1800) was an Irish portrait painter.

== Biography ==
Thompson was born in Dublin about 1730. He received his artistic education in London, and does not seem to have exhibited his works elsewhere. Between 1760 and 1782 he exhibited forty-three portraits at the Society of Artists, of which he was for some time secretary, and one portrait at the Free Society of Artists. Though valuable as likenesses, his portraits do not show much artistic merit. A couple of them were engraved in mezzotint. Having married a wealthy lady, he temporarily abandoned his profession, but got into debt and was imprisoned. His noisy protests against his incarceration earned for him some notoriety. After the death of his first wife he married another rich woman, and was enabled to retire from active work. He was connected with the notorious house in Soho Square kept by Mrs. Theresa Cornelys, where he founded and carried on a school of oratory. He died suddenly in London early in 1800.

He published "An Enquiry into the Elementary Principles of Beauty in the Works of Nature and Art," and also, anonymously, in 1771, "The Conduct of the Royal Academicians while members of the Society of Arts, from 1760 to their expulsion in 1769."
