= William Thomson (artist) =

British Canadian Artist

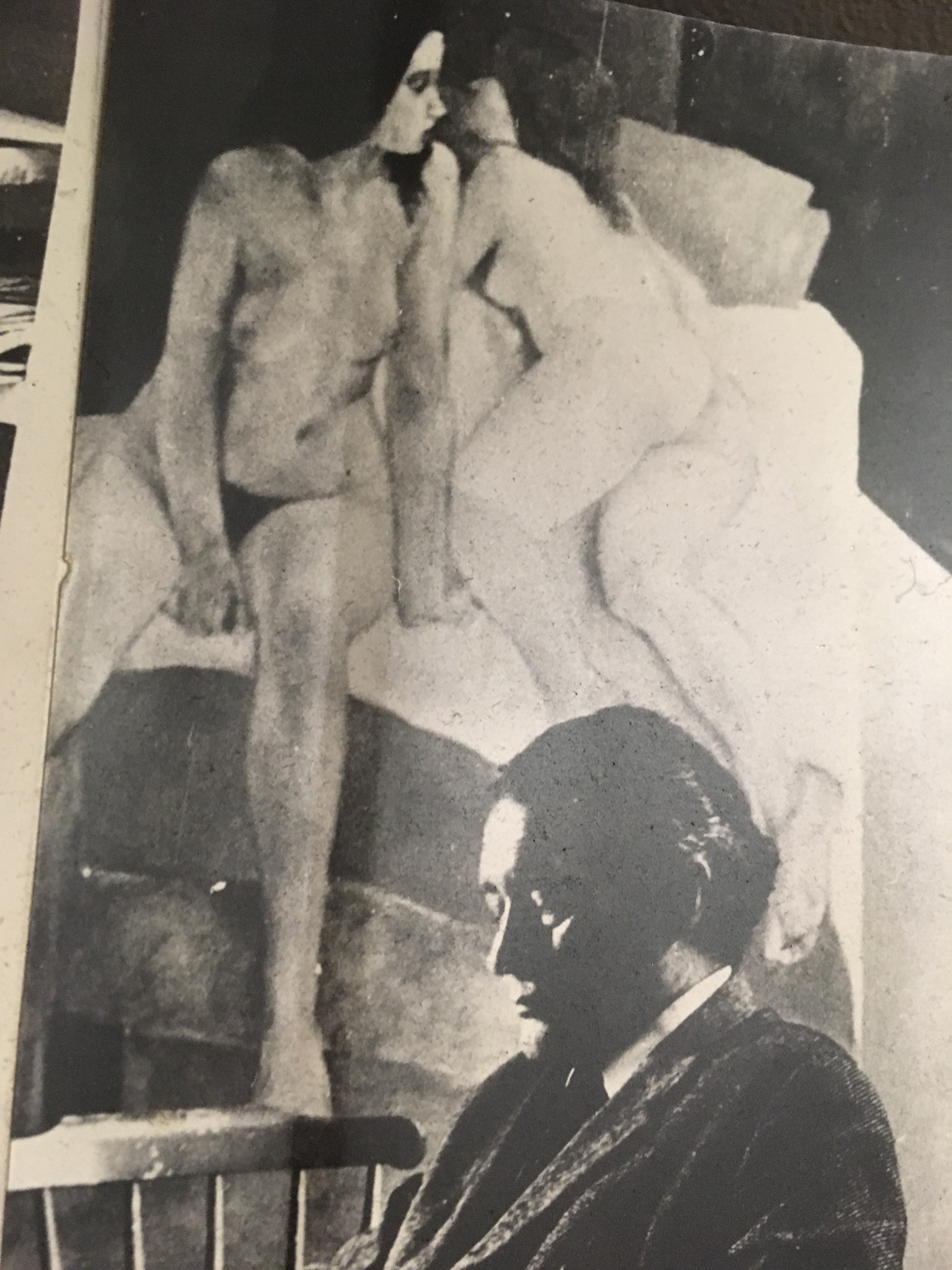
- Born: 1926
- Died: 1988 (aged 61–62)
- Education: Royal Academy of Art, Royal College of Art.
- Known for: Painting

William Robinson Thomson RBA, ARCA (born 24 January 1926 – 1988) was a British artist within the Modern British school of the late twentieth century. He is known for his portraiture and paintings of the female nude. Major influences on his work included Rembrandt, Degas and Cezanne.

== Early life and education ==
Thomson was born in Hamilton, Ontario. His father, Frank Clifford Thomson, was an insurance broker and Honorary Lieutenant Colonel of the Royal Hamilton Life Infantry, who was awarded the Military Cross during WW1.

After studying at Hillfield School, Upper Canada College, Toronto and McMaster University, he served with the RCNVR from 1943 to 1945. He graduated from Ontario College of Art with the Governor General's 'Gold Medal' in 1947—having studied under the artist, John Alfsen.

Thomson was 21 when he was awarded a scholarship to study at the Royal Academy Schools, London. He then transferred to the Royal College of Art, where his teachers included Francis Bacon, Rodrigo Moynihan and Robert Buhler, graduating in 1952. In 1953, he worked at his painting, took portrait commissions, plus a mural commission from the Johnson-Matthey Corporation, and exhibited pictures in mixed shows around the country, working towards his own view of the world, with particular interest in the human form.

Thomson was one of the founding members of the Design and Artists Copyright Society (DACS).

== Teaching career ==
In 1953, he gained his first teaching post at Heatherley School of Art. In 1957, Oskar Kokoschka, invited him to study at the Salzburg Summer School, where he went on to teach as one of four assistants until the school ended in 1963. In 1964, he became a senior lecturer in drawing and painting at Maidstone College of Art, Kent. Thomson went on to teach at Central School of Art and Design, London, where he maintained a life class until 1986.

== Thomson and the figurative tradition ==
Thomson was compelled to understand and represent the human form, a discipline which put him at odds with contemporary conceptualists. This fascination was the central driver for his artistic process. Two decades later, Thomson's work was acknowledged by the art critic, Clement Greenberg, who, when asked if he knew of "any figurative painting today which is large scale and which sustains itself?" responded, "Lucian Freud… Peter Blake and William Thomson - especially Thomson, who should be better known."

Art critic, Edwin Mullins, summed up Thomson's approach in Apollo Magazine, "Thomson adopts a traditional approach to the figure: a muscular sensuality adapted from Kokoschka, a caressing tenderness reminiscent of Bonnard. His best things are the large nudes, their forms defined by warm, lyrical passages of paint. Here is a rich talent in the process of discovering its personality."

ArtReview described Thomson's paintings as having "a luminous radiance", noting that he organised his work "with the greatest care for the balance of tone. Each one has a carefully calculated pictorial unity his paintings of landscapes, cityscapes and nudes in oils and acrylics set out to satisfy".

Thomson's artistic circle included Frank Bowling, David Hockney and Elisabeth Frink.

== Exhibitions ==
Between 1955 and 1987, Thomson had nineteen solo exhibitions in the UK and Canada, and his work was regularly exhibited at group exhibitions, including at The Royal Academy of Arts which nominated him for membership in 1976. In 1988, the year he died, all three of the paintings he submitted for the Summer Exhibition were exhibited.

Thomson's first solo exhibition was in 1955 at The St George's Gallery. The art critic, Eric Newton, wrote, "Thomson deals with the undramatic domesticities that were first discovered by Degas, were developed by Sickert and the Camden Town School, and were later taken over by the Euston Road painters. Thomson handles them with quiet reverence, never forcing his chairs or tables into theatrical situations. Each of his pictures is organised with the greatest care for balance of tone, and each one has a carefully calculated pictorial unity."

F.W. Fenton, the critic of the Morning Post and The Daily Telegraph, wrote "Kokoshka's influence shows itself superficially in the way Thomson handles paint, the brush strokes deceptively casual and the colours cleverly broken. But the influence the matters goes deeper. His nudes, in conventional poses, glow and throb like a strong watercolour. His watercolours which show the draughtsman beneath the painter are, without exception, magnificent."

Thomson's final show in 1988 was an exhibition of his portraits of children. The art critic, Max Wykes-Joyce, wrote, "Nowhere anything too pretty or oversweet, just active, breathing, and on the whole mischievous beings limned to the life. It's a good, good show."

His work is held by The Museum of Fine Arts, Boston and at several Canadian galleries, including the Art Gallery of Hamilton.

== Commissions ==
Thomson's portrait commissions included paintings of several well-known figures, including artist, Frank Bowling, sculptor, Elisabeth Frink, and former BBC executive, Huw Wheldon

== Television ==
Thomson appeared in four episodes of the television series, The Art Game, a general knowledge art quiz. He also worked on the panel for the BBC art history series, Monitor. In the 1950s and 1960s, he played various roles in television and films, including BBC Sunday-Night Theatre (1950), Para Handy - Master Mariner (1959) and Three Ring Circus (1961). During the 1970s, he produced and presented art documentaries for the BBC, including Monitor (Summer in Salzburg), Canvas (Rembrandt's "Family Group", "Lady Howe: Gainsborough" and Turner's "The Fighting Temeraire") and Release (about artist, Ben Nicholson).

== Personal life ==
Thomson lived in Chelsea for all of his life in London, and was chairman of the Chelsea Arts Club from 1975 to 1977. His passions did not stop at painting, with the Times describing him as "a man with many and varied talents, an accomplished pianist and guitarist."

Between 1949 and 1961, Thomson was married to Margaret Williamson, the daughter of Tarka The Otter author, Henry Williamson. In 1975, he married fashion model and knitwear designer, Jacqueline Craven, with whom he had a daughter and a son.
