= Duncan Neale =

English footballer

Personal information
- Date of birth: 1 October 1939 (age 87)
- Place of birth: Worthing, England
- Position: Midfielder

Senior career*
Years	Team	Apps	(Gls)
1960–1963	Newcastle United	88	(8)
1963–1970	Plymouth Argyle	146	(8)
Total		234	(16)
- * Club domestic league appearances and goals

Duncan Neale (born 1 October 1939) is an English retired footballer who played as a midfielder.

He began his career in non-league football with Ilford before signing professional terms with Newcastle United in 1959. He made his first team debut in 1960 and went on to make 88 league appearances in three years with the club, scoring eight goals. Neale joined Plymouth Argyle in 1963 and his versatility proved to be an asset, as he helped the club reach the semi-finals of the League Cup in 1965. He made 166 appearances in all competitions between 1963 and 1970, scoring nine goals, before returning to non-league football with Plymouth City.
