= Gordon Hughes =

English footballer (born 1936)

Personal information
- Full name: Gordon Hughes
- Date of birth: 19 June 1936
- Place of birth: Washington, England
- Position: Right winger

Senior career*
Years	Team	Apps	(Gls)
19xx–1956	Tow Law Town		
1956–1963	Newcastle United	133	(18)
1963–1968	Derby County	184	(22)
1968–1971	Lincoln City	117	(9)
1971–1972	Boston United		
- * Club domestic league appearances and goals

Gordon Hughes (born 19 June 1936) is an English former professional footballer who scored 49 goals from 434 appearances in the Football League playing for Newcastle United, Derby County and Lincoln City. He played as a right winger.

== Life and career ==
Hughes was born in Washington, which was then in County Durham. He worked as a coal miner and played football part-time for Tow Law Town; even when he joined First Division club Newcastle United in 1956 he did not initially go full-time. He became a first-team regular in the 1957–58 season, and remained so for four years. He was involved in one of the highest-scoring matches in the club's history, in September 1958. Newcastle led at Chelsea by four goals to three with half an hour to play when Hughes had to leave the field with a broken nose and eye damage. Although Newcastle scored again, Chelsea came back with three goals in the last ten minutes to win 6–5. After more than a year out with a spinal injury that he thought might end his career, Hughes returned to Newcastle's first team in March 1963 with two goals against Bradford City in the FA Cup.

After Peterborough United failed to sign him ahead of the April transfer deadline, Hughes signed for Second Division Derby County for a £10,000 fee. He played more than 200 times for Derby, then joined Lincoln City towards the end of the 1967–68 season. He spent three years in the Fourth Division with Lincoln, playing 131 games in all competitions, and was released in March 1971.

He then moved into non-League football with Northern Premier League club Boston United, managed by former Lincoln teammate Jim Smith. He helped them reach the third round proper of the FA Cup in 1971–72, and ended his Boston career at the end of that season.
