= William Thomson (silversmith) =

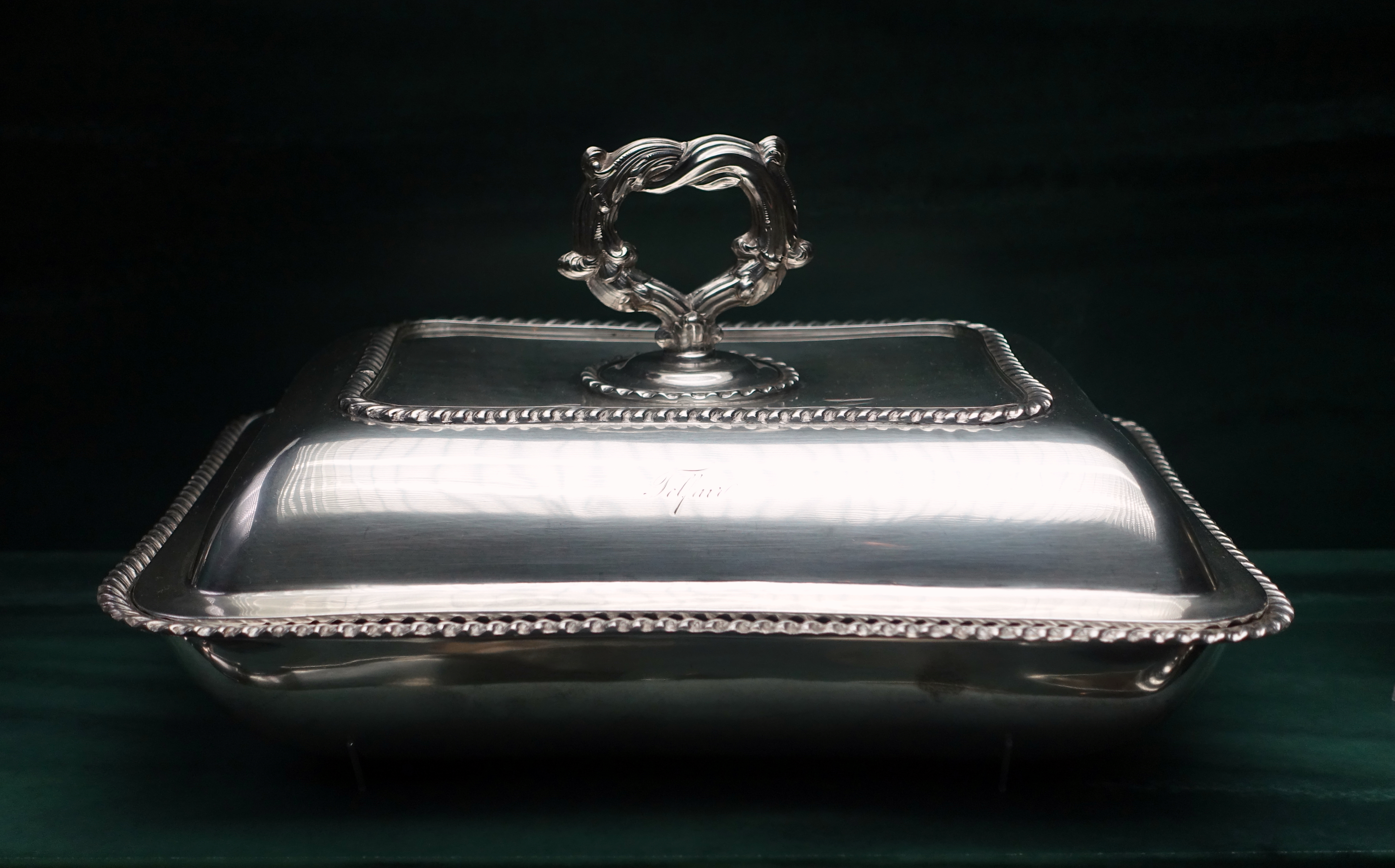
Covered entree dish by William Thomson, c. 1830

William Thomson (1777–1833) was an American silversmith active in New York City. He had shops at 399 Broadway and William Street, and was commissioned by the City to make a silver service for Captain Samuel Chester Reid for gallant bravery at the Battle of Fayal. His work is collected in the Metropolitan Museum of Art, Museum of the City of New York, and Winterthur Museum.
