= William James Thomson =

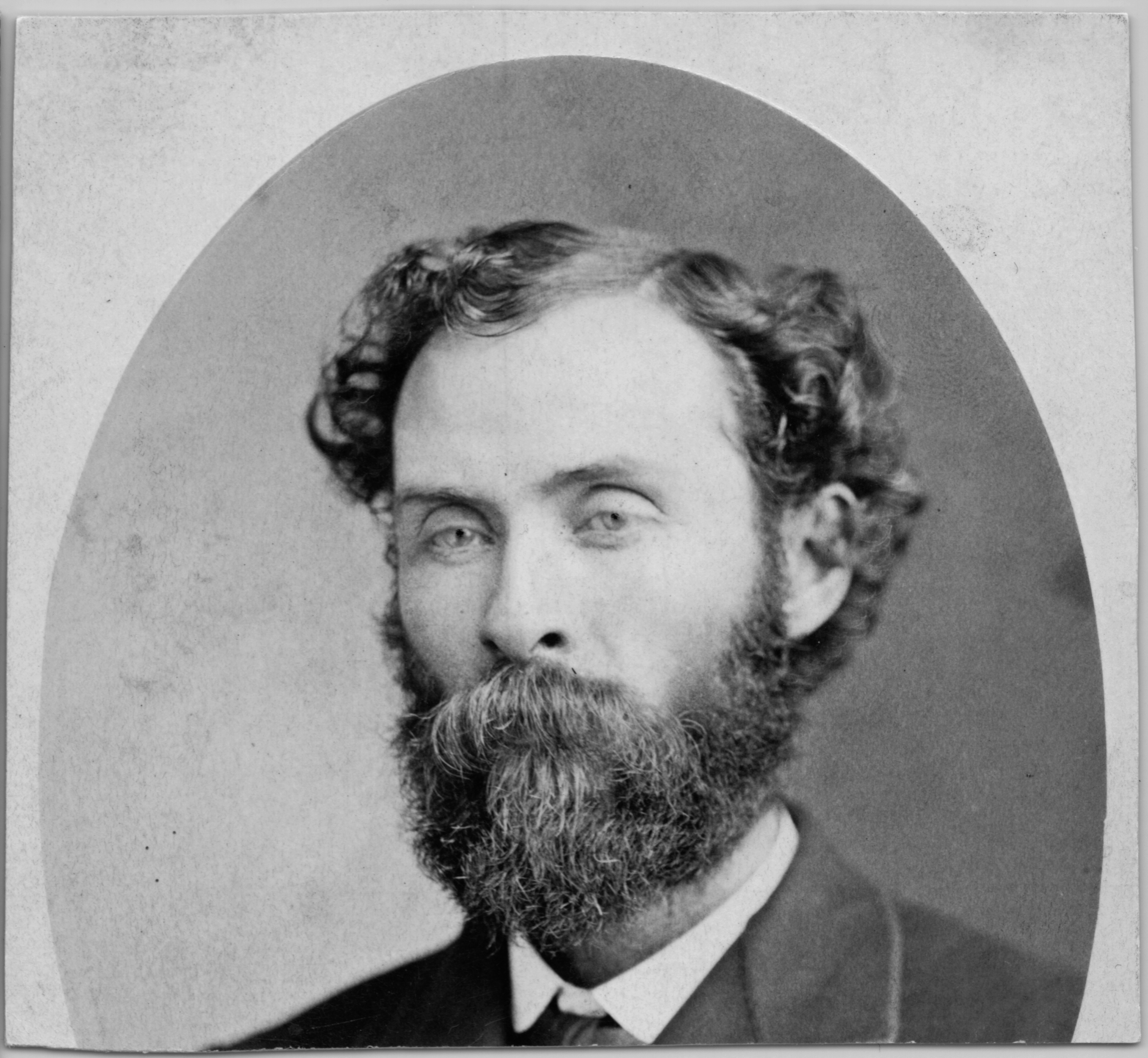
- Born: Guelph, Ontario
- Died: April 28, 1927 (aged 69); Toronto
- Occupation: artist
- Known for: engraver and artist who recorded structures of Toronto

William James Thomson was a Canadian artist and engraver, best known for the images he recorded of Toronto. Some of those structures are only known from his paintings, drawings, and engravings.

From 1889-1893 Thomson worked as an engraver for the Toronto Globe. The Archives of Ontario curates a collection of over 900 of his Globe engravings.

Thomson became the first President of the Society of Canadian Painter-Etchers and Engravers, in 1916.

Thomson was born in Guelph, Ontario. He attended the Ontario College of Art, where his instructors included John Arthur Fraser.

Thomson's patrons included Sir Byron Edmund Walker and James Mavor.

He was a founding member of the Ontario Archeological Association, precursor of the Ontario Archaeological Society.
