= William Thompson (archdeacon of Wellington) =

William George Osborne Thompson was a Canadian Anglican priest in the 20th Century.

Rigby was educated at the Trinity College, Toronto and ordained in 1912. After a curacy at St Matthew, Toronto he held incumbencies at Beamsville, Riverstown, Stoney Creek and Port Colborne. He was Archdeacon of Wellington, ON from 1944 to 1954.
