= William Hanna Thomson =

American Physician and Christian writer

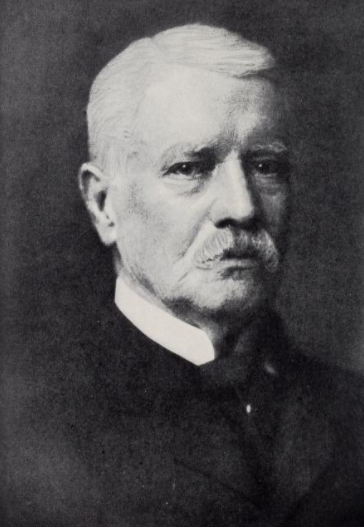
- Born: 1833; Beirut
- Died: January 18, 1918 (aged 84–85); New York City
- Occupations: Physician, writer

William Hanna Thomson (1833 – January 18, 1918) was an American physician and Christian writer.

== Biography ==
Thomson was born in Beirut. He was the son of missionary William McClure Thomson. He was educated in the United States and obtained his B.A. from Wabash College (1850), M.D. from Albany College (1859), M.A. from Yale University (1861) and LL. D. from New York University (1885).

Thomson was assistant physician at Quarantine Hospital in New York and physician to the Charity Hospital. He was a consulting physician to Roosevelt Hospital and Bellevue Hospital. He was Professor of Medicine at New York University Medical College. Thomson was a member of the New York Neurological Society. He was President of the New York Academy of Medicine during 1899–1900.

His book Life, Death and Immortality (1911), defended Christian immortality.

== Selected publications ==
- Materialism and Modern Physiology of the Nervous System (1892)
- Brain and Personality (1906)
- The Great Argument: Or Jesus Christ in the Old Testament (1884)
- What is Physical Life?: Its Origins and Nature (1909)
- Life, Death and Immortality (1911)
- Life and Times of the Patriarchs (1912)
- A Treatise on Clinical Medicine (1914)
