= George Dalton =

English footballer

Personal information
- Full name: George Dalton
- Date of birth: 4 September 1941 (age 85)
- Place of birth: Dilston, Northumberland, England
- Height: 5 ft 9 in (1.75 m)
- Positions: Left half; left back

Youth career
- 19??–1958: Newcastle United

Senior career*
Years	Team	Apps	(Gls)
1958–1967	Newcastle United	85	(2)
1967–1968	Brighton & Hove Albion	24	(0)
- * Club domestic league appearances and goals

George Dalton (born 4 September 1941) is an English former professional footballer who played as a left half or left back in the Football League for Newcastle United and Brighton & Hove Albion.

== Life and career ==
Dalton was born in 1941 in Dilston, Northumberland. He began his football career with Newcastle United as a youngster, and turned professional in 1958. Playing at left half, he made his first-team debut in the League Cup against Colchester United in October 1960 and his first appearance in the First Division the following February. He established himself as a regular in consideration for a first-team place – but not a regular selection – over the next couple of years, until he was a surprise choice at left back for the Second Division visit to Swansea Town in March 1963, had an "outstanding" match, and retained the position thereafter. In early 1964, he was touted for selection for the England under-23 side, but was not included. On 30 March, in a match against Leeds United, his 40th appearance of the season, Dalton's leg was badly broken. He played once more for Newcastle's first team, some two and a half years later, but, as the Evening Chronicle wrote, his "bright career was tragically dimmed" when he broke his leg, and he was released on a free transfer in May 1967.

He signed for Brighton & Hove Albion, established himself in their first team, and made 28 appearances in 1967–68, of which 24 were in the Third Division, before re-breaking the leg in January 1968. He retired from senior football forthwith, but remained with Brighton, studying physiotherapy and coaching the juniors. When Brighton manager Freddie Goodwin took over at Birmingham City in 1970, Willie Bell and Dalton accompanied him as coach and trainer respectively. The Birmingham club were later fined for making an illegal approach to and then employing Bell without his contracted club's permission, but a similar complaint regarding Dalton was dismissed because he was available on a free transfer. Dalton was at Birmingham until early 1976, when he joined Coventry City as physiotherapist. He remained with that club for two decades in various capacities, and was the physio of the team that won the 1986–87 FA Cup.
