= Charlie Woods (footballer) =

English footballer

Personal information
- Full name: Charles Morgan Parkinson Woods
- Date of birth: 18 March 1941 (age 85)
- Place of birth: Whitehaven, England
- Position: Forward

Senior career*
Years	Team	Apps	(Gls)
?–1959	Cleator Moor Celtic		
1960–1962	Newcastle United	26	(7)
1962–1964	Bournemouth	70	(26)
1964–1966	Crystal Palace	49	(5)
1966–1970	Ipswich Town	82	(5)
1970–1972	Watford	42	(3)
1971	→ Colchester United (loan)	3	(0)
Total		272	(46)
- * Club domestic league appearances and goals

Charles Morgan Parkinson Woods (born 18 March 1941) is an English former professional footballer who played as a forward. Born in Whitehaven, Woods played in the Football League for Newcastle United, Bournemouth, Crystal Palace, Ipswich Town, Watford and Colchester United.

== Playing career ==
Woods made his professional debut for Newcastle United on 31 August 1960, after his move from amateur club Cleator Moor Celtic in May 1959. This was a League Division One match held at Craven Cottage; home of Fulham F.C.(Fulham v Newcastle United, score 4–3 to Fulham, attendance 21,361). Woods scored for Newcastle in this his debut game as did Ivor Allchurch and Gordon Hughes. Woods went on to make 26 appearances for Newcastle scoring seven times before moving to Bournemouth in 1962, for whom he made 70 appearances (26 goals) over the next two seasons. On 26 November 1964, Woods signed for Crystal Palace making 49 appearances (five goals) before moving on to Ipswich Town in July 1966. Woods played 82 times for Ipswich over the next four years (five goals), moving to Watford in 1970 (42 appearances, three goals), where, after a brief loan spell at Colchester United, he retired from playing in 1972.

== Later career ==
When Sir Bobby Robson became Ipswich Town Manager (1969–82) Woods, having retired as a player, became youth team coach and went on to coach players such as Alan Brazil, Paul Mariner, Clive Woods, George Burley, Paul Cooper, Kevin Beattie and Brian Talbot, who became the core of the Ipswich Town UEFA Cup-winning team in 1981–82, and runners-up in the English First Division in 1980–81 and 1981–82. He later became assistant manager to Bobby Ferguson at Ipswich. He was dismissed from the club along with Ferguson in 1987, after they failed to earn promotion from the Second Division. Woods also served Ipswich as a Coach under Manager George Burley.

Woods joined Sir Bobby Robson as a scout during his years as England Manager (1982–1990) and when Robson joined Newcastle United in 1999 he immediately appointed Charlie Woods as Chief Scout. In this role at Newcastle, Woods was involved in bringing players such as Laurent Robert and Charles N'Zogbia to the club. Woods left Newcastle United when Sir Bobby Robson's management and coaching team were sacked by then Newcastle United Chairman Freddie Shepherd in 2004.

== Honours ==
Ipswich Town

- Football League Second Division: 1967–68

Individual

- Ipswich Town Hall of Fame: Inducted 2016
