= Bill Thompson (Australian footballer) =

Australian rules footballer

Personal information
- Full name: William Hargreaves Thompson
- Born: 7 September 1876; Prahran, Victoria
- Died: 22 December 1965 (aged 89); Preston, Victoria
- Original team: Prahran

Playing career^{1}
Years	Club	Games (Goals)
1899–1900	Fitzroy	10 (1)
- ^{1} Playing statistics correct to the end of 1900.

William Hargreaves Thompson (7 September 1876 – 22 December 1965) was an Australian rules footballer who played with Fitzroy in the Victorian Football League (VFL).

== Family ==
The son of John Edward Thompson and Jane Smith Thompson, née Ingram, William Hargreaves Thompson was born in Prahran on 7 September 1876.

He married Jessie Helen Adams in 1918: they had two children.

== Death ==
He died on 22 December 1965.

== Sources ==
- Holmesby, Russell & Main, Jim (2009). The Encyclopedia of AFL Footballers. 8th ed. Melbourne: Bas Publishing.
