= William Harvey Thompson =

American police officer

William Harvey Thompson (died August 3, 1927) was a prohibition enforcement agent in the Seattle, Washington, unit of the Prohibition Bureau. Widely known as "Kinky", because of his tight curly hair, Thompson's career illustrated one of the problems - unprofessional enforcement - that led to increasing opposition to National Prohibition in the United States (1920–1933).

== Career ==
Thompson's first mention in the press occurred after he shot a moonshine still-tender through the stomach during a raid.

Later Thompson reported that bootleggers attacked him late one night as he was driving on a deserted country road. He claimed that, while a car was overtaking him, he was shot in the arm. However, police investigators found substantial evidence that Thompson had fabricated the whole story.

Thompson used a blackjack on a man who had no reputation for violence. A jury hearing the resulting case denounced Thompson for his brutal beating of the defendant. The judge who presided at the trial later called Thompson's supervisor into his chamber and warned him about Thompson's behavior. Thompson later blackjacked a twelve-year-old boy, the boy's mother, and his one-legged father. He subsequently pistol-whipped a manacled prisoner in full view of a crowd of onlookers who were outraged at his behavior.

Thompson's "favorite tactic was to walk into a joint, grab a pitcher of beer, and pour the contents on the bar, then offer to reimburse the nearest drinker. If the man denied that the beer was his, [Thompson] would strike him over the head with a shot-filled blackjack, and then wring a confession by painfully twisting the victim's arm."

Bureau of Prohibition officials defended their agents' violence, arguing that they bravely had to consume alcohol as part of their undercover work and that it threatened their health and caused crazed behavior. However, a local newspaper asked why patrons who consumed the same beverages did not become similarly crazed with an uncontrollable desire to injure others and destroy property.

On July 27, 1927, Tacoma police were summoned to a drunken fight between a couple in a parked car. Officer William Nerbornne asked the driver to move on. At that point the driver became belligerent and reached for something in his coat but Nerbornne fired first, fatally wounding Thompson.

Thompson was eulogized as a martyr for the dry cause and his death was blamed on societal disrespect for law and order. Federal Prohibition officials later praised Thompson's "zeal" but never acknowledged that he had ever used excessive force.

== See also ==
- McNeil Island
- Roy Olmstead
- Rum row
