= William McClure Thomson =

American missionary (1806–1894)

William Thomson
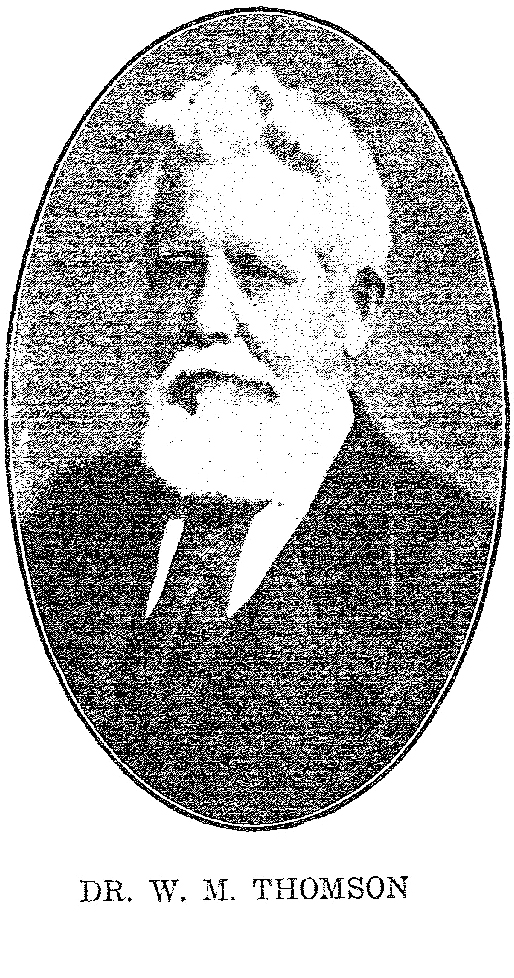
- Portrait of Dr. W. M. Thomson
- Born: William McClure Thomson; December 31, 1806; Springdale, Ohio
- Died: April 8, 1894 (aged 87); Denver, Colorado
- Other name: أبو طنجرة (Abu Tanjera)
- Education: Miami University
- Occupation: Missionary
- Known for: Establishing the American University of Beirut (formerly the Syrian Protestant College)

William McClure Thomson (31 December 1806 – 8 April 1894) was an American Protestant missionary who worked in Ottoman Syria. After spending 25 years in Syria, he published a bestselling book - The Land and the Book - that described his experiences and observations during his travels. He used his knowledge of the region to illustrate and explain passages from the Bible, giving readers a new perspective on the scriptures.

== Career ==
Thomson was the son of a Presbyterian minister. He was a graduate of Miami University, Ohio.

When he arrived in Beirut on February 24, 1833, he was only the eighth American Protestant missionary to arrive in the region. Two of his predecessors had died, and two had been recalled. In April 1834, Thomson was in Jaffa when a revolt broke out, and he was unable to return to Jerusalem until Ibrahim Pasha recaptured the city with 12,000 troops. While he was away, his wife had given birth to a son, but she died just 12 days after he returned.

After his wife's death, Thomson relocated to Beirut with his young son. There, in 1835, with Rev. Story Hebard, he established a boarding school for boys. In August 1840, Thomson and other American missionaries were evacuated from Beirut by the USS Cyane, and witnessed the bombardment of the city by a coalition of British, Austrian, and Turkish naval forces under the command of Charles Napier. The bombardment, which lasted for one month, forced Pasha's army to retreat. Meanwhile, a conflict broke out between the Druze and Maronite communities in Lebanon. In 1843, Thomson and Cornelius Van Alen Van Dyck founded a boys seminary in Abeih, Lebanon. Two years later, in 1845, a new outbreak of violence occurred, and Thomson once again played a role in negotiating a truce.

His local nickname became Abu Tangera - father of the cooking pot - after his broad-rimmed hat. With his local knowledge, he was used as a dragoman by several Biblical scholars. In 1852, he accompanied one of the founders of modern Biblical archeology, Edward Robinson on his second tour of the Holy Land.

He remained in Sidon until 1857, when he returned to America for two years.

His magnum opus, The Land and the Book, was first published in 1859, and became one of the bestselling Travelogues of Palestine.

In 1860 full scale civil war broke out in Lebanon. The conflict lasted 60 days and spread to Damascus. Thomson supervised the distribution of £30,000 of money, food and clothing amongst the thousands of destitute refugees. At a Beirut Mission Meeting on 23 January 1862, he proposed the establishment of a college with Daniel Bliss as its president. The Syrian Protestant College was established in 1866 with 16 students. This college evolved into the American University of Beirut. Theophilus Waldmeier's autobiography states that it was on Thomson's advice, in 1873, that Waldmeier established Brummana High School.

== Family ==
By 1834 he was married, and he and wife were living in Jerusalem; she gave birth to their son, but died a few days later.

In 1835, Thomson married Maria Abbott, the widow of the English Consul; Maria had three daughters, one of whom married the missionary Cornelius Van Alen Van Dyck.
