= Bill Thompson (Arkansas politician) =

American state legislator (1915–1981)

Member of the Arkansas House of Representatives
- In office January 12, 1953 – August 4, 1981
- Preceded by: R. Allen Lynch
- Succeeded by: Norma Thompson
- Constituency: Poinsett County (1953‍–‍1967); 17th district (1967‍–‍1973); 67th district (1973‍–‍1981)

Personal details
- Born: William Henry Thompson; January 26, 1915 Memphis, Tennessee, U.S.
- Died: August 4, 1981 (aged 66) Little Rock, Arkansas, U.S.
- Party: Democratic
- Spouse: Norma

William Henry Thompson (January 26, 1915 – August 4, 1981) was an American state legislator in Arkansas. He served in the Arkansas House of Representatives from 1953 until his death in 1981, when his wife Norma Thompson replaced him.
