= Brattleboro Islanders =

- 1911; Brattleboro, Vermont

Minor league affiliations
- Class: Class D (1911)
- League: Twin States League (1911)

Major league affiliations
- Team: None

Minor league titles
- League titles (1): 1911

Team data
- Name: Brattleboro Islanders (1911)
- Ballpark: Island Park (1911)

The Brattleboro Islanders were a minor league baseball team based in Brattleboro, Vermont. In 1911, the Islanders were charter members of the Class D level Twin States League and won the league championship in the league's only season of play. The Battleboro Islanders were the flagship franchise of the league, playing home games at Island Park, which sat within the Connecticut River.

== History ==
The Battleboro Islanders were formed in 1911, as the result of a business venture, with the team becoming the flagship franchise of the Twin State League. Brattleboro, Vermont businessmen George Fox and Michael Moran purchased the property of Island Park and formed the Island Park Amusement Company. The company constructed a new amusement park on the, island, which was located on the Connecticut River. The amusement park contained a new 1,200 seat ballpark. The amusement park venture and the ballpark were named "Island Park." The location was strategic. Because Vermont's Blue Laws in the era did not allow businesses to be open on Sundays, the official New Hampshire location of the island provided an escape from the legal issue.

With the new ballpark on Island Park, the owners aspired to host a team in the venue. Local financial support for a franchise to play in the new ballpark at Island Park was secured and the Brattleboro Islanders were formed. Needing opponents to play, the three other league cities were recruited and franchises developed. The Twin States League was officially formed on March 12, 1911. The Twin States League formed as a Class D level minor league. Brattleboro joined the Bellows Falls Sulphites, Keene Medics and Springfield–Charlestown Hyphens as charter members.

Brattleboro and the Twin States League schedule ran from July 1, 1911 to September 4, 1911, with all teams playing a 36–game schedule.

The Brattleboro manager was E.L. Breckenridge, who had coached baseball at Amherst College, Dartmouth College and Williams College.

On opening day at Island Park, the Brattleboro and visiting Bellow Falls teams marched in a parade behind a band. The parade route ran from the Brattleboro town hall, down Main Street, across the bridge and into the ballpark. The Islanders won the opening day game 8–3 in front of a full grandstand, with 1,200 in attendance.

On the final day of the 1911 season, the Islanders clinched the league championship when they defeated Keene 2–0. A crowd of 3,500 was on hand for the game, as the crowd lined up along the foul lines and the outfield after the grandstand became full. A special train had arrived from Keene, carrying fans for the game.

In the final standings, Battleboro finished 2.0 games ahead of second place Keene. The Brattleboro Islanders (22–14) were followed by the Keene Medics (20–16), Bellows Falls Sulphites (15–20) and Springfield-Charlestown Hyphens (14–21) in the official standings of the four–team league.

Tim Horan, of the Brattleboro Islanders, hit .300 to win the Twin States League batting championship.

After the 1911 season, the Twin States League was no longer a minor league baseball league. The league did continue play in 1912 as a semi–pro league, with Brattleboro as a member.

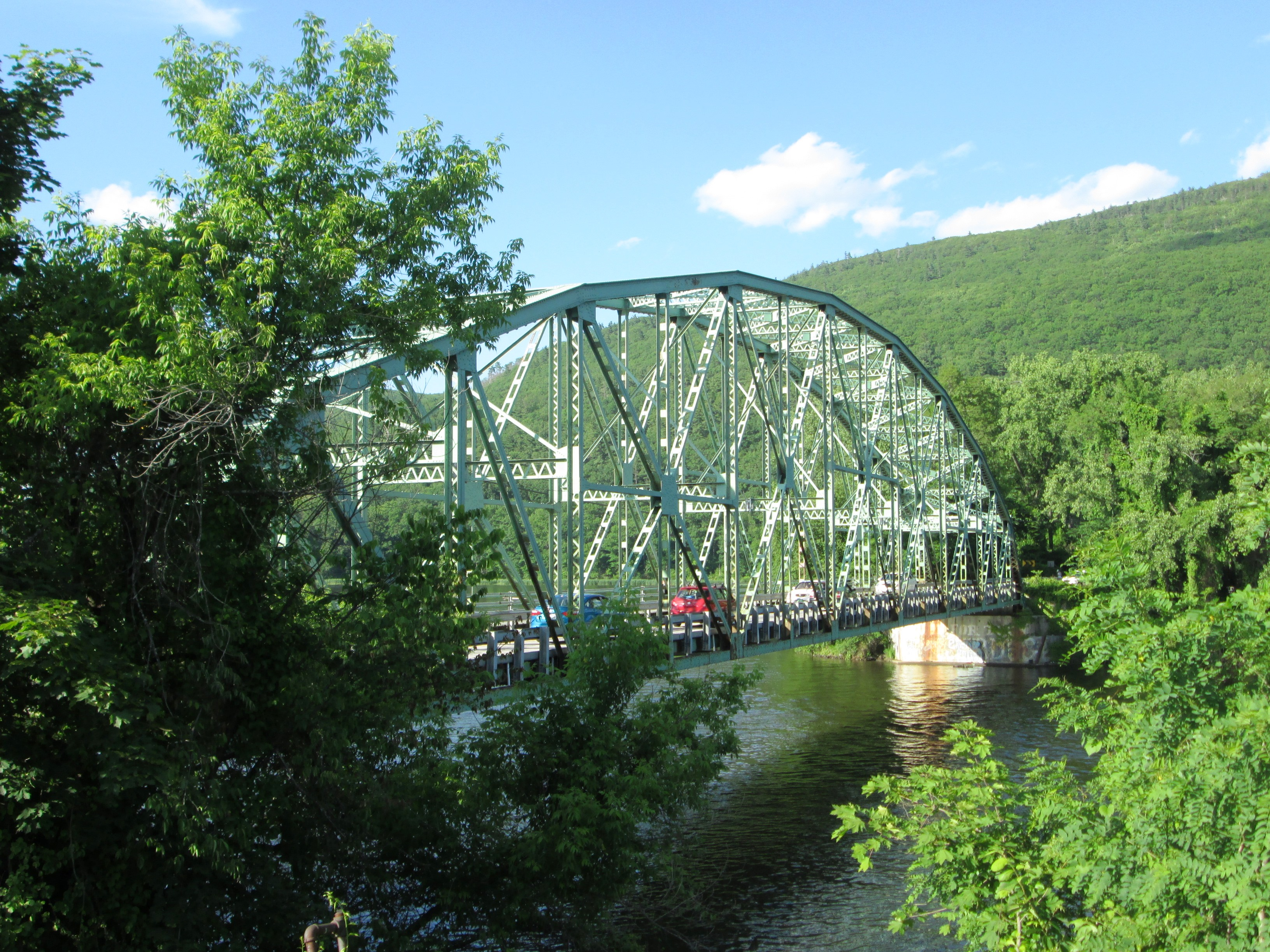
(2013) Bridge Street Bridge. Brattleboro.

== The ballpark ==
The Islanders played 1911 home games at Island Park. The ballpark no longer exists. The amusement park and ballpark were located on the Brattleboro end of the island, which was 22-acres in size in the era. Island Park was located within the Connecticut River, setting between Brattleboro, Vermont and Hinsdale, New Hampshire. In the era there was a toll bridge that connected Brattleboro and Hinsdale with the island. Continual flooding eventually ended the public use of the island, with a 1936 flood wiping out most structures remaining on the island. Today, the Bridge Street Bridge, built in 1920, connects to the island on the east, linking Brattleboro to the island. The west bridge then connects into Hinsdale.

== Year–by–year records ==
Year	Record	Finish	Manager	Notes
1911	22–14	1st	E.L Breckenridge	League champions

== Notable alumni ==
- Paul Wachtel (1911)

The complete player roster for the 1911 Brattleboro Islanders is unknown.
