= Bill Thompson (footballer, born 1940) =

English footballer

Personal information
- Full name: William Thompson
- Date of birth: 5 January 1940
- Place of birth: Bedlington, England
- Date of death: 30 September 2011 (aged 71)
- Place of death: Bedlington, England
- Position: Centre half

Youth career
- –: Newcastle United

Senior career*
| Years | Team | Apps | (Gls) |
| 1957–1967 | Newcastle United | 80 | (1) |
| 1967–1968 | Rotherham United | 8 | (0) |
| 1968–1970 | Darlington | 30 | (5) |
| Total | | 118 | (6) |
- * Club domestic league appearances and goals

William Thompson (5 January 1940 – 30 September 2011) was an English footballer who made 118 appearances in the Football League playing as a centre half for Newcastle United, Rotherham United and Darlington in the 1960s.

Thompson was born in Bedlington, Northumberland, in 1940. He began his football career as a junior with Newcastle United, and made his first-team debut on 5 November 1960 in a 4–2 defeat away to Chelsea in the First Division. Over a ten-year career with Newcastle disrupted by injury, he made 90 appearances in all competitions and scored once, in a 3–2 First Division defeat at Sheffield United in November 1965. He was selected for the England under-23 team, but injury prevented his appearing. He moved on to Rotherham United for a £15,000 fee in June 1967, but played only eight times in the Second Division and three times in the League Cup before dropping out of the starting eleven. In January 1968, Thompson signed for Fourth Division club Darlington, for whom he scored five goals from 30 league appearances over two-and-a-half seasons, after which he retired from football.

Thompson died in Bedlington in 2011 at the age of 71.
