= Billy Thompson (baseball) =

American baseball player

- Outfielder
- Born: January 14, 1874; Louisa County, Virginia, U.S.
- Died: May 12, 1960 (aged 86); Boston, Massachusetts, U.S.

Negro league baseball debut
- 1900, for the Cuban Giants

Last appearance
- 1900, for the Cuban Giants

Teams
- Cuban Giants (1900)

William Penn Thompson (January 14, 1874 – May 12, 1960) was an American Negro league outfielder in the 1900s.

A native of Louisa County, Virginia, Thompson began his baseball career playing for the Concord, New Hampshire YMCA team in 1891 and went on to play for the Cuban Giants in 1900 and later the Philadelphia Giants. He remained in Concord most of his life, and in 1960 the city named a local park in his honor. Thompson died in Boston, Massachusetts in 1960 at age 86.
