= Green formula =

In mathematics, Green formula may refer to:

- Green's theorem in integral calculus
- Green's identities in vector calculus
- Green's function in differential equations
- the Green formula for the Green measure in stochastic analysis
