= Robert Murphy (mathematician) =

Irish mathematician & physicist (1806–1843)

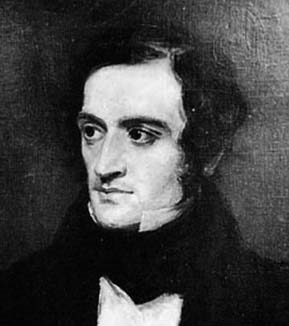
- Born: 1806; Mallow, County Cork, Ireland
- Died: 12th of March 1843 (aged 36); London, England
- Education: Caius College
- Known for: Algebraic Equations; Integral Equations; Operational calculus

Robert Murphy FRS (1806 – 12 March 1843) was an Irish mathematician and physicist who made contributions to algebra.

== Early life and education ==
Robert Murphy was born in 1806 in Mallow, County Cork, Ireland and was baptized in the Church of Ireland on 8 March 1807, the third son (of seven children) of John Murphy, a shoemaker, and Margaret Murphy. When he was 11, Murphy was run over by a cart in an accident that resulted in a fractured thighbone. This incident left him bedridden for one year. During this time, Murphy read the works of Euclid and studied algebra.

Anonymous solutions to mathematical problems posed in a local newspaper brought Murphy attention from a mathematical tutor in Cork, named Mulcahy. Money was found for him to attend Mr Hopley's school in Mallow. Murphy then had sponsorship to take him to Trinity College, Dublin, in 1823; but was not admitted. With support from Robert Woodhouse, he was brought to Cambridge on the strength of a pamphlet on the duplication of the cube. He was admitted as a pensioner to Gonville and Caius College, Cambridge, on 7 July 1825.

Murphy won the 1st Mathematics Prize in 1826 and went on to graduate with a first class degree, B.A. in 1829, as 3rd wrangler. It led to Murphy being awarded a Perse Fellowship. At the same time, to help his financial position, he was appointed as Librarian.

== Later life ==
Murphy gave six Hebrew lectures in 1830 (receiving £10 as payment), and was appointed as a junior dean in charge of discipline and chapel services in October 1831, a position he held until 1833. He was ordained a deacon on 4 June 1831 and gave Greek lectures in 1832. But he never obtained a senior fellowship at Caius.

While living in London in difficult circumstances, Murphy wrote a paper on what are now called non-commutative rings. He was elected to a Stokes Fellowship by Caius College, Cambridge in 1838. He was appointed as an examiner of mathematics and natural philosophy at the University of London in October 1838.

== Death ==
Murphy's years of alcohol abuse took a toll on his health. In 1843, he contracted tuberculosis of the lungs. He died soon after, on March 12, 1843. Murphy was buried in Kensal Green Cemetery, London, where "[t]he grave has no headstone nor landing stone nor surround. It is totally unmarked".

== Publications ==
In 1830 Murphy was commissioned to write a book on the mathematical theory of electricity, for the use of students at Cambridge. Elementary Principles of Electricity, Heat, and Molecular Actions, part i. On Electricity (Cambridge) was published in 1833. His other book was Theory of Algebraical Equations, in "Library of Useful Knowledge", London, 1839, reprinted 1847.

=== Papers and articles ===
Refutation of a Pamphlet Written by the Rev. John Mackey Entitled "A Method of Making a Cube a Double of a Cube, Founded on the Principles of Elementary Geometry", wherein His Principles Are Proved Erroneous and the Required Solution Not Yet Obtained (1824) was the work that launched Murphy's career. Another notable paper was "On the inverse method of definite integrals". Transactions of the Cambridge Philosophical Society. 4: 353–408. 1833. It included the first citation of the work of George Green. Murphy recognized its value, in particular Green's "1828 essay".

Murphy contributed other mathematical papers to the Cambridge Philosophical Transactions (1831–1836), Philosophical Magazine (1833–1842), and the Philosophical Transactions (1837). Encouraged by Augustus De Morgan, Murphy wrote articles for the Society for the Diffusion of Useful Knowledge and for the Penny Cyclopaedia. His final works were Remark on Primitive Radices (1841), Calculations of Logarithms by Means of Algebraic Fractions (1841), and On Atmospheric Refraction (1842). De Morgan claimed "He had a true genius for mathematical invention".
