= Green's law =

Equation describing evolution of waves in shallow water

Propagation of shoaling long waves, showing the variation of wavelength and wave height with decreasing water depth.

In fluid dynamics, Green's law, named for 19th-century British mathematician George Green, is a conservation law describing the evolution of non-breaking, surface gravity waves propagating in shallow water of gradually varying depth and width. In its simplest form, for wavefronts and depth contours parallel to each other (and the coast), it states:

$H_1\, \cdot\, \sqrt[4]{h_1} = H_2\, \cdot\, \sqrt[4]{h_2}$ or $\left(H_1\right)^4\, \cdot\, h_1 = \left(H_2\right)^4\, \cdot\, h_2,$

where $H_1$ and $H_2$ are the wave heights at two different locations – 1 and 2 respectively – where the wave passes, and $h_1$ and $h_2$ are the mean water depths at the same two locations.

Green's law is often used in coastal engineering for the modelling of long shoaling waves on a beach, with "long" meaning wavelengths in excess of about twenty times the mean water depth. Tsunamis shoal (change their height) in accordance with this law, as they propagate – governed by refraction and diffraction – through the ocean and up the continental shelf. Very close to (and running up) the coast, nonlinear effects become important and Green's law no longer applies.

== Description ==
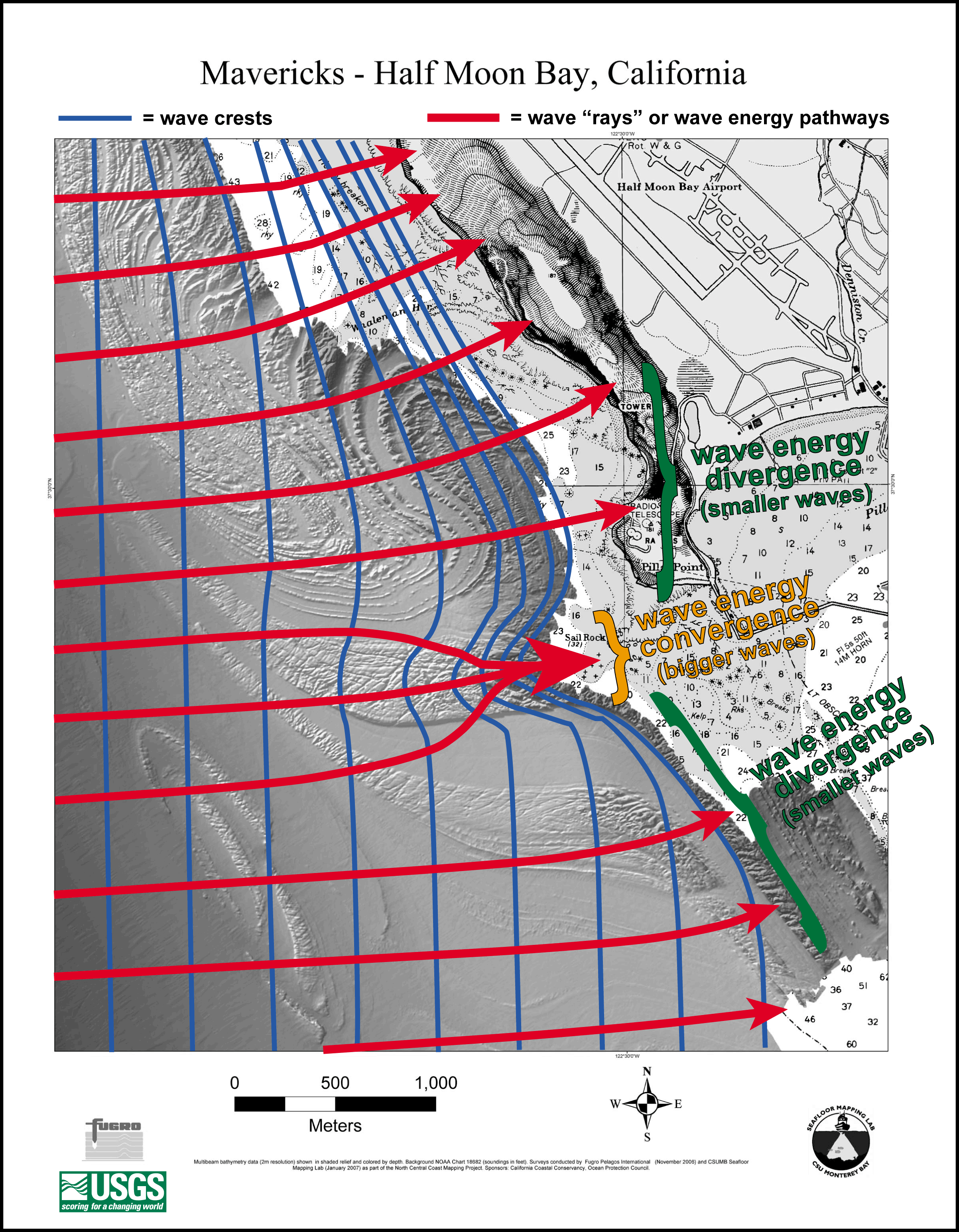
Convergence of wave rays (reduction of width $b$) at Mavericks, California, producing high surfing waves. The red lines are the wave rays; the blue lines are the wavefronts. The distances between neighboring wave rays vary towards the coast because of refraction by bathymetry (depth variations). The distance between wavefronts reduces towards the coast because of wave shoaling (decreasing depth $h$).

According to this law, which is based on linearized shallow water equations, the spatial variations of the wave height $H$ (twice the amplitude $a$ for sine waves, equal to the amplitude for a solitary wave) for travelling waves in water of mean depth $h$ and width $b$ (in case of an open channel) satisfy

$$H\, \sqrt{ b }\, \sqrt[4]{h} = \text{constant},$$

where $\sqrt[4]{h}$ is the fourth root of $h.$ Consequently, when considering two cross sections of an open channel, labeled 1 and 2, the wave height in section 2 is:

$$H_2 = \sqrt{\frac{b_1}{b_2}}\; \sqrt[4]{\frac{h_1}{h_2}}\; H_1,$$

with the subscripts 1 and 2 denoting quantities in the associated cross section. So, when the depth has decreased by a factor sixteen, the waves become twice as high. And the wave height doubles after the channel width has gradually been reduced by a factor four. For wave propagation perpendicular towards a straight coast with depth contours parallel to the coastline, take $b$ a constant, say 1 metre or yard.

For refracting long waves in the ocean or near the coast, the width $b$ can be interpreted as the distance between wave rays. The rays (and the changes in spacing between them) follow from the geometrical optics approximation to the linear wave propagation. In case of straight parallel depth contours this simplifies to the use of Snell's law.

Green published his results in 1838, based on a method – the Liouville–Green method – which would evolve into what is now known as the WKB approximation. Green's law also corresponds to constancy of the mean horizontal wave energy flux for long waves:

$$b\, \sqrt{gh}\, \tfrac18 \rho g H^2 = \text{constant},$$

where $\sqrt{gh}$ is the group speed (equal to the phase speed in shallow water), $\tfrac18 \rho g H^2 = \tfrac12 \rho g a^2$ is the mean wave energy density integrated over depth and per unit of horizontal area, $g$ is the gravitational acceleration and $\rho$ is the water density.

=== Wavelength and period ===
Further, from Green's analysis, the wavelength $\lambda$ of the wave shortens during shoaling into shallow water, with

$$\frac{\lambda}{\sqrt{g\,h}} = \text{constant}$$

along a wave ray. The oscillation period (and therefore also the frequency) of shoaling waves does not change, according to Green's linear theory.

== Derivation ==
Green derived his shoaling law for water waves by use of what is now known as the Liouville–Green method, applicable to gradual variations in depth $h$ and width $b$ along the path of wave propagation.

=== Wave equation for an open channel ===
Starting point are the linearized one-dimensional Saint-Venant equations for an open channel with a rectangular cross section (vertical side walls). These equations describe the evolution of a wave with free surface elevation $\eta(x,t)$ and horizontal flow velocity $u(x,t),$ with $x$ the horizontal coordinate along the channel axis and $t$ the time:

$$\begin{align}
&b\, \frac{\partial \eta}{\partial t} + \frac{\partial (b\, h\, u)}{\partial x} = 0,
\\
&\frac{\partial u}{\partial t} + g\, \frac{\partial \eta}{\partial x} =0,
\end{align}$$

where $g$ is the gravity of Earth (taken as a constant), $h$ is the mean water depth, $b$ is the channel width and $\partial/\partial t$ and $\partial/\partial x$ are denoting partial derivatives with respect to space and time. The slow variation of width $b$ and depth $h$ with distance $x$ along the channel axis is brought into account by denoting them as $b(\mu x)$ and $h(\mu x),$ where $\mu$ is a small parameter: $\mu \ll 1.$ The above two equations can be combined into one wave equation for the surface elevation:

$\frac{\partial^2 \eta}{\partial t^2} - \frac{g}{b}\, \frac{\partial}{\partial x} \left( b\, h\, \frac{\partial \eta}{\partial x} \right) = 0,$ and with the velocity following from $u = - g \int \frac{\partial \eta}{\partial x}\; \mathrm{d}t.$	1

In the Liouville–Green method, the approach is to convert the above wave equation with non-homogeneous coefficients into a homogeneous one (neglecting some small remainders in terms of $\mu$).

=== Transformation to the wave phase as independent variable ===
The next step is to apply a coordinate transformation, introducing the travel time (or wave phase) $\tau$ given by

$\frac{\mathrm{d} x}{\mathrm{d} \tau} = \sqrt{g\, h},$ so $\tau = \int_{x_0}^x \frac{1}{\sqrt{g\,h(\mu s)}}\; \mathrm{d}s$

and $x$ are related through the celerity $c=\sqrt{gh}.$ Introducing the slow variable $X=\mu x$ and denoting derivatives of $b(X)$ and $h(X)$ with respect to $X$ with a prime, e.g. $b'=\mathrm{d}b/\mathrm{d}X,$ the $x$-derivatives in the wave equation, Eq. (1), become:

$$\begin{align}
& \frac{\partial\eta}{\partial x}
=\left (\frac{\mathrm{d}x}{\mathrm{d}\tau}\right)^{-1}\, \frac{\partial\eta}{\partial\tau}
= \frac{1}{\sqrt{g\,h}}\, \frac{\partial\eta}{\partial\tau}
\qquad \text{and}
\\
& \frac{\partial}{\partial x} \left( b\, h\, \frac{\partial\eta}{\partial x} \right)
= b\, h\, \frac{\partial^2\eta}{\partial x^2} + \mu \left( b'\, h + b\, h' \right)\, \frac{\partial\eta}{\partial x}
= \frac{b}{g}\, \frac{\partial^2 \eta}{\partial \tau^2}
+ \mu\, \frac{ b'\, h + \tfrac12\, b\, h' }{\sqrt{gh}}\, \frac{\partial \eta}{\partial \tau}.
\end{align}$$

Now the wave equation (1) transforms into:

$\frac{\partial^2 \eta}{\partial t^2} - \frac{\partial^2 \eta}{\partial \tau^2} - \mu\, \sqrt{g\,h}\, \left( \frac{b'}{b} + \tfrac12\, \frac{h'}{h} \right)\, \frac{\partial \eta}{\partial \tau} = 0.$	2

The next step is transform the equation in such a way that only deviations from homogeneity in the second order of approximation remain, i.e. proportional to $\mu^2.$

=== Further transformation towards homogeneity ===
The homogeneous wave equation (i.e. Eq. (2) when $\mu$ is zero) has solutions $\eta=F(t\pm\tau)$ for travelling waves of permanent form propagating in either the negative or positive $x$-direction. For the inhomogeneous case, considering waves propagating in the positive $x$-direction, Green proposes an approximate solution:

$\eta(\tau,t) = \Theta(X)\, F(t-\tau).$	3

Then

$$\begin{align}
\frac{\partial^2 \eta}{\partial t^2}
& = \Theta\, \frac{\mathrm{d}^2 F}{\mathrm{d} \tau^2},
\\
\frac{\partial \eta}{\partial \tau}
& = \Theta\, \frac{\mathrm{d} F}{\mathrm{d} \tau}
+ \mu\, \sqrt{g\,h}\, \Theta'\, F
\qquad \text{and}
\\
\frac{\partial^2 \eta}{\partial \tau^2}
& = \Theta\, \frac{\mathrm{d}^2 F}{\mathrm{d} \tau^2}
+ 2\, \mu\, \sqrt{g\,h}\, \Theta'\, \frac{\mathrm{d} F}{\mathrm{d} \tau}
+ \mu^2\, g\, h\, \Theta''\, F.
\end{align}$$

Now the left-hand side of Eq. (2) becomes:

$$\mu\, \sqrt{g\,h}\, \left( 2\, \frac{\Theta'}{\Theta} + \frac{b'}{b} + \tfrac12\, \frac{h'}{h} \right)\,
\Theta\, \frac{\mathrm{d} F}{\mathrm{d} \tau}
+
\mu^2\, g\, h\, \left( \frac{\Theta''}{\Theta'} + \frac{b'}{b} + \tfrac12\, \frac{h'}{h} \right)\,
\Theta'\, F.$$

So the proposed solution in Eq. (3) satisfies Eq. (2), and thus also Eq. (1) apart from the above two terms proportional to $\mu$ and $\mu^2$, with $\mu\ll 1.$ The error in the solution can be made of order $\mathcal{O}(\mu^2)$ provided

$$2\, \frac{\Theta'}{\Theta} + \frac{b'}{b} + \tfrac12\, \frac{h'}{h} = 0.$$

This has the solution:

$$\Theta(X) = \alpha\, b^{-\tfrac12}\, h^{-\tfrac14}.$$

Using Eq. (3) and the transformation from $x$ to $\tau$, the approximate solution for the surface elevation $\eta(x,t)$ is

$\eta(x,t) = b^{-\tfrac12}(x)\; h^{-\tfrac14}(x)\; F\left( t - \int_{x_0}^x \frac{1}{\sqrt{g\,h(s)}}\; \mathrm{d}s \right) + \mathcal{O}(\mu^2),$	4

where the constant $\alpha$ has been set to one, without loss of generality. Waves travelling in the negative $x$-direction have the minus sign in the argument of function $F$ reversed to a plus sign. Since the theory is linear, solutions can be added because of the superposition principle.

=== Sinusoidal waves and Green's law ===
Waves varying sinusoidal in time, with period $T,$ are considered. That is

$$\eta(x,t) = a(x)\, \sin( \omega\, t - \phi(x) ) = \tfrac12\, H(x)\, \sin( \omega\, t - \phi(x)),$$

where $a$ is the amplitude, $H=2 a$ is the wave height, $\omega=2\pi/T$ is the angular frequency and $\phi(x)$ is the wave phase. Consequently, also $F$ in Eq. (4) has to be a sine wave, e.g. $F=\beta\sin(\omega t-\phi(x))$ with $\beta$ a constant.

Applying these forms of $\eta$ and $F$ in Eq. (4) gives:

$$H\, b^{\tfrac12}\, h^{\tfrac14} = \beta,$$

which is Green's law.

=== Flow velocity ===
The horizontal flow velocity in the $x$-direction follows directly from substituting the solution for the surface elevation $\eta(x,t)$ from Eq. (4) into the expression for $u(x,t)$ in Eq. (1):

$$\begin{align}
u(x,t) &= g^{\tfrac12}\; b^{-\tfrac12}(x)\; h^{-\tfrac34}(x)\;
F\left( t - \int_{x_0}^x \frac{1}{\sqrt{g\,h(s)}}\; \mathrm{d}s \right)
\\
&+ \mu\, \tfrac12\, g\, b^{-\tfrac12}(x)\; h^{-\tfrac14}(x)\; \frac{(b\, \sqrt{h})'}{b\, \sqrt{h}}\, \Phi(x,t)
+ \frac{Q}{b(x)\, h(x)}
+ \mathcal{O}\left( \mu^2 \right),
\\
& \qquad \text{with} \qquad
\Phi(x,t) = \int_{t_0}^t F\left( \sigma - \int_{x_0}^x \frac{1}{\sqrt{g\,h(s)}}\; \mathrm{d}s \right)\; \mathrm{d}\sigma
\end{align}$$

and $Q$ an additional constant discharge.

Note that – when the width $b$ and depth $h$ are not constants – the term proportional to $\Phi(x,t)$ implies an $\mathcal{O}(\mu)$ (small) phase difference between elevation $\eta$ and velocity $u$.

For sinusoidal waves with velocity amplitude $V,$ the flow velocities shoal to leading order as

$$V\, b^{\tfrac12}\, h^{\tfrac34} = \text{constant}.$$

This could have been anticipated since for a horizontal bed $V = \sqrt{g\,h}\,(a/h) = \sqrt{g/h}\,a$ with $a$ the wave amplitude.
