= Mary Cannell =

English historian of physics (1913–2000)

Doris Mary Cannell
- Born: 19 July 1913; Liverpool, England
- Died: 18 April 2000 (aged 86); Nottingham, England
- Occupations: Educator; Historian
- Known for: George Green (1993)

Academic background
- Education: Merchant Taylors' School for Girls; University of Liverpool

Academic work
- Discipline: History
- Sub-discipline: History of physics; Biography
- Institutions: Nottingham College of Education; Nottingham Trent University

Doris Mary Cannell (19 July 1913 – 18 April 2000) was an English educator and historian of early 19th-century mathematical physics, in particular the works of George Green.

== Early life ==
Cannell was educated in Liverpool, with a scholarship to the selective private Merchant Taylors' School for Girls followed by a BA from the University of Liverpool in French with History subsidiary. She then gained a Postgraduate Diploma in Education and held teaching posts in the UK and France.

== Career ==
During World War II she lectured to troops and this changed the direction of her career into higher education and the training of teachers. In 1960 she was appointed the deputy principal of the new Nottingham College of Education. In 1974, as acting principal, she led the formation of what became Nottingham Trent University, bringing together her college, Trent Polytechnic and other educational institutions in Nottingham.

== Research ==
After her retirement in the 1970s, she again changed direction to become a respected historian of mathematics. Her major achievement was rediscovering the importance of George Green in the development of nineteenth-century applied physics. He had initially worked as a miller near Nottingham, and although his mathematical discoveries were known and used worldwide, very little was known about his life. Her major biography of him, published in 1993, brought his work, life and legacy together for the first time, introducing him as an important influence in nineteenth-century applied physics. A second edition was published posthumously by the Society for Industrial and Applied Mathematics (SIAM) in 2001. Cannell and colleagues at Nottingham led the recovery of his legacy, completing the restoration of his windmill in time for his bicentenary in 1993.

Papers of D.M. Cannell relating to her research on George Green are held within the George Green Collection at the University of Nottingham Manuscripts and Special Collections.

She was made a Fellow of the University of Nottingham in 1995. She also became an honorary graduate of the Open University in 1996, and of Nottingham Trent University in 2000, after her death

== Legacy ==
The Mary Cannell Summer Studentships in mathematics at the University of Nottingham, funded from a legacy she made, commemorate her.

== Selected publications ==
- D. M. Cannell, "George Green: an enigmatic mathematician", (1999) American Mathematical Monthly, 106, 136–51
- D.M. Cannel and N.J. Lord, "George Green: Mathematician and Physicist", (1993) The Mathematical Gazette vol. 77, (478), 26-51.
- D.M. Cannell, George Green, Mathematician and Physicist, 1793-1841: The Background to His Life and Work. London: The Athlone Press. Second edition published 2001 by The Society for Industrial and Applied Mathematics.
