= Green's matrix =

In mathematics, and in particular ordinary differential equations, a Green's matrix helps to determine a particular solution to a first-order inhomogeneous linear system of ODEs. The concept is named after George Green.

For instance, consider $x'=A(t)x+g(t)\,$ where $x\,$ is a vector and $A(t)\,$ is an $n\times n\,$ matrix function of $t\,$, which is continuous for $t\isin I, a\le t\le b\,$, where $I\,$ is some interval.

Now let $x^1(t),\ldots,x^n(t)\,$ be $n\,$ linearly independent solutions to the homogeneous equation $x'=A(t)x\,$ and arrange them in columns to form a fundamental matrix:

$$X(t) = \left[ x^1(t),\ldots,x^n(t) \right].\,$$

Now $X(t)\,$ is an $n\times n\,$ matrix solution of $X'=AX\,$.

This fundamental matrix will provide the homogeneous solution, and if added to a particular solution will give the general solution to the inhomogeneous equation.

Let $x = Xy\,$ be the general solution. Now,

$$\begin{align}
x' & =X'y+Xy' \\
& = AXy+Xy' \\
& = Ax + Xy'.
\end{align}$$

This implies $Xy'=g\,$ or $y = c+\int_a^t X^{-1}(s)g(s)\,ds\,$ where $c\,$ is an arbitrary constant vector.

Now the general solution is $x=X(t)c+X(t)\int_a^t X^{-1}(s)g(s)\,ds.\,$

The first term is the homogeneous solution and the second term is the particular solution.

Now define the Green's matrix
$$G_0(t,s)= \begin{cases} 0 & t\le s\le b \\ X(t)X^{-1}(s) & a\le s < t. \end{cases}\,$$

The particular solution can now be written $x_p(t) = \int_a^b G_0(t,s)g(s)\,ds.\,$
