= George Green (mathematician) =

British mathematical physicist (1793–1841)

- Born: 14 July 1793; Sneinton, Nottinghamshire, England
- Died: 31 May 1841 (aged 47); Nottingham, Nottinghamshire, England
- Education: Gonville and Caius College, Cambridge (BA, 1838)
- Known for: Green measure; Cauchy–Green tensor; Green's function; Green's identities; Green's law; Green's matrix; Green's theorem; Liouville–Green method
- Scientific career
- Fields: Mathematical physics
- Workplaces: Caius College, Cambridge
- Patrons: Edward Bromhead

George Green (14 July 1793 – 31 May 1841) was a British mathematical physicist born in Sneinton, Nottinghamshire, now part of the city of Nottingham. Despite receiving little recognition during his lifetime, he is best remembered for his Essay on electricity and magnetism published in 1828. In this essay he introduced an early version of Green's theorem in vector calculus, the notion of potential functions as currently used in physics, and a method of solving differential equations called Green's functions. This paper formed the foundation for the work of later scientists such as William Thomson (later Lord Kelvin), among many others. His work on potentials ran parallel to that of Carl Friedrich Gauss.

As a mathematician, he was almost entirely self-taught, receiving only about one year of formal schooling as a child, between the ages of eight and nine. Green then worked his father's bakery from a young age, and later at the mill his father constructed in 1807, now known as Green's Windmill. Whilst working as a miller, he became a member of Nottingham Subscription Library through which he was able to access contemporary mathematical knowledge.

Green formed a relationship with Jane Smith, the daughter of the mill manager William Smith. Although the couple never married, they had seven children together and she later adopted Green's surname.

After the death of his father in 1829, he was left a substantial inheritance, allowing him to give up milling to pursue mathematics. In 1833, Green began a formal education at the University of Cambridge and was elected a fellow at Caius College after his graduation. Throughout his time at the university, he wrote six papers on hydrodynamics, acoustics, and optics.

In 1840, he fell ill and returned to Nottingham where he died of influenza the following year, on 31 May 1841. After his death, his Essay was rediscovered by William Thomson (later Lord Kelvin) who promoted Green's work and used it in his own research on electricity and magnetism. Today, Green's functions remain a standard tool for solving differential equations in modern physics, including in quantum electrodynamics (QED) and condensed-matter physics.

== Early life ==
Green was born and lived for most of his life in the English town of Sneinton, Nottinghamshire, now part of the city of Nottingham which then had a population of around 30,000. He was baptized on 14 July 1793. His father, also named George, was a baker who had built and owned a brick windmill used to grind grain.

=== Robert Goodacre's Academy ===
During this era, most children received little schooling beyond being taught to read and write at Sunday schools. Green was fortunate in that his father was able and willing to have him privately educated. He entered the academy of Robert Goodacre, a man known for his enthusiasm towards the sciences and education. The academy's "philosophical instruments" included an "electrical machine" and an orrery. However, Green stayed for only 18 months before returning to work at his father's bakery.

=== Move from Nottingham to Sneinton ===
In 1773, George's father moved to Nottingham, which at the time had a reputation for being a pleasant town with open spaces and wide roads. By 1831, however, the population had increased nearly five times, in part due to the budding Industrial Revolution, and the city became known as one of the worst slums in England. There were frequent riots by starving workers, often associated with special hostility towards bakers and millers on the suspicion that they were hiding grain to drive up food prices.

For these reasons, in 1807, George Green senior bought a plot of land in Sneinton. On this plot of land he built a "brick wind corn mill", now referred to as Green's Windmill. It was technologically impressive for its time, but required nearly twenty-four-hour maintenance, which was to become Green's burden for the next twenty years.

== Adult life ==
=== Miller ===
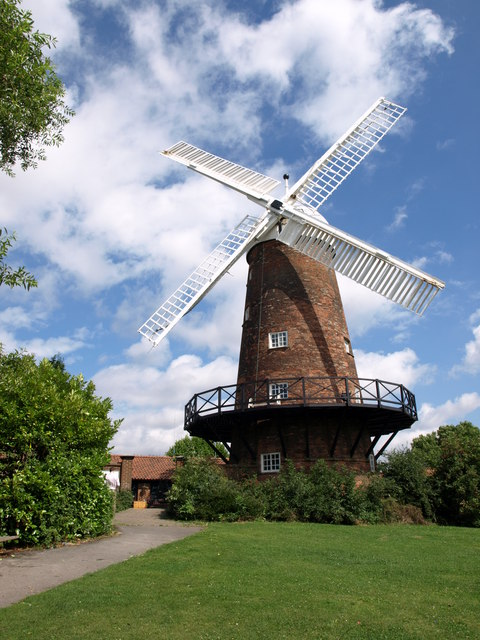
Green's Mill in Sneinton, originally owned by Green's father. The mill was renovated in 1985 and is now a science centre.

Just as with baking, Green found the responsibilities of operating the mill annoying and tedious. Grain from the fields was arriving continuously at the mill's doorstep, and the sails of the windmill had to be constantly adjusted to the wind speed, both to prevent damage in high winds, and to maximise rotational speed in low winds. The millstones that would continuously grind against each other, could wear down or cause a fire if they ran out of grain to grind. Every month the stones, which weighed over a ton, would have to be replaced or repaired.

=== Family life ===
In 1823, Green formed a relationship with Jane Smith, the daughter of William Smith, hired by Green Senior as mill manager. Although Green and Jane Smith never married, Jane eventually became known as Jane Green and the couple had seven children together; all but the first had Green as a baptismal name. The youngest child was born 13 months before Green's death. Green provided for his (so-called) common-law wife and children in his will.

=== Nottingham Subscription Library ===
When Green was thirty, he became a member of the Nottingham Subscription Library, then the intellectual heart of the town. It still exists today as the Bromley House Library. This library was likely the main source of Green's advanced mathematical knowledge, giving him access to the Philosophical Transactions of the Royal Society, among other scientific journals. While foreign journals were not available, the Transactions did mention their contents, which allowed Green to obtain reprints directly from their authors.

== Formal education and academic career ==
By the time Green's father died in 1829, the senior Green had become one of the gentry due to his considerable accumulated wealth and land owned, roughly half of which he left to his son and the other half to his daughter. The young Green, now thirty-six years old, consequently was able to use this wealth to abandon his miller duties and pursue mathematical studies.

A pivotal figure in Green's mathematical education was Reverend John Toplis (c. 1774–1857), who graduated in mathematics from Cambridge as 11th Wrangler in 1802. He then served as headmaster of the Nottingham Free Grammar School 1806–1819, and lived in the same neighbourhood as Green and his family. Toplis was an advocate of the continental school of mathematics, and fluent in French, having translated Pierre-Simon Laplace's celebrated work on celestial mechanics (Traité de mécanique céleste). The possibility that Toplis played a role in Green's mathematical education would resolve several long-standing questions about the sources of Green's mathematical knowledge. In the Preface to his 1814 translation of Laplace, Toplis recommended the works of French mathematicians Joseph-Louis Lagrange, Adrien-Marie Legendre, and Sylvestre François Lacroix. These and other Continental mathematicians extended the works of Sir Isaac Newton on mechanics, written in terms of synthetic geometry, using analytical methods. Toplis—and later Green—employed the notation of Leibniz rather than Newton for the differentials.

Green likely learned much from the 1816 exposition of Jean-Baptiste Biot on the electrical experiments of Charles-Augustin de Coulomb and from the Transactions of the Cambridge Philosophical Society.

=== 1828 essay ===
In 1828, Green published An Essay on the Application of Mathematical Analysis to the Theories of Electricity and Magnetism, the 72-page work for which he is most famous today. It was the custom at that time to publish one's scientific paper via the journals of either the Royal Society or the Cambridge Philosophical Society. However, Green chose to publish his first work at his own expense, because he thought it would be presumptuous for a man of his station, with no formal education in mathematics, to submit the paper to an established journal. When Green published his Essay, it was sold on a subscription basis to 51 people, many of whom were members of the Nottingham Subscription Library, though few are thought to have understood its mathematical content. These people were local doctors, clergymen, schoolmasters, and lace and hosiery manufacturers.

While Green had hoped that publishing his Essay would bring recognition from mainstream academics in Great Britain and beyond, there was initially no response, with one exception. The wealthy landowner and mathematician Edward Bromhead bought a copy and responded immediately, encouraging Green to do further work in mathematics. As a wealthy public figure who maintained contacts with academia, Bromhead was in a position to be Green's benefactor. However, not believing the offer was sincere given the difference in social class, Green did not contact Bromhead for twenty months.

Green's decision to include "Mathematical Analysis" in the title of his Essay was an acknowledgement of the influence of Continental mathematics. He began by referring to a 1771 paper by Henry Cavendish on electricity, where he noted and rectified an unsatisfactory claim, then moved on to the memoirs of Siméon Denis Poisson. The notion of the potential was first developed by Laplace in his research on gravitation and celestial mechanics and subsequently applied in electromagnetism by Poisson. In his Essay, Green introduced the term potential and applied this concept masterfully, establishing some key results. One of these was Green's theorem, which was related to Gauss' theorem, relating the properties of a function on the boundary of a domain with the interior. (Also see the Fundamental Theorem of Calculus.) In his 1839 memoir, Karl Friedrich Gauss independently introduced the same terminology. Green also cited Book 3 of Laplace's Mecanique celeste for its use of the Legendre polynomials and Jean-Baptiste Joseph Fourier's Theorie analytique de la chaleur (Analytical Theory of Heat). Whereas Poisson had only determined the charge distribution on the surface of a conductor with simple geometry, Green showed how to do so for arbitrary cases. The key tools he employed here were Green's identities, which he proved by integrating by parts. Today, these are typically obtained by applying Gauss' theorem. Green explained how to obtain the general solution in terms of the system's response to a unit input, that is, Green's function.

This seminal paper was initially ignored during Green's lifetime but was later reprinted many times and translated into German. After this paper, Green turned his attention to other topics, namely, hydrodynamics, wave motion, and optics, as advised by Bromhead, who was of the opinion that electricity and magnetism were not of interest to British mathematicians at the time.

=== Cambridge ===
Members of the Nottingham Subscription Library who knew Green repeatedly insisted that he obtain a proper university education. After they met, Green let Bromhead know of his dream of attending the University of Cambridge. With Bromhead's help, he fulfilled that wish, and matriculated at Cambridge in 1833, as an undergraduate at Gonville and Caius College, the same one Bromhead went to. He was particularly insecure about his lack of fluency in Greek and Latin, which were prerequisites, but it turned out not to be as hard for him to learn these as he had envisaged, as the degree of mastery required was not as high as he had expected. He won the first-year mathematical prize. After sitting in the Mathematical Tripos in January 1837, he became 4th Wrangler (the 4th highest scoring student in his graduating class, coming after James Joseph Sylvester who scored 2nd) and graduated with a BA in 1838. Another source of concern for Green was the existence of Jane and the children, as the university required students to remain celibate. But this was apparently not a problem because he and Jane were not formally married.

At Cambridge, Green befriended Charles Babbage and John Hershel, two of the members of the Analytical Society whose aim was to promote the symbolic calculus that developed from the works of Gottfried Wilhelm Leibniz. They viewed it as superior to the method of 'fluxions' of Sir Isaac Newton, which was then in vogue in Britain.

=== College fellow ===
In the following two years, he presented an additional six papers on hydrodynamics, acoustics, and optics. As a result, Green was elected a fellow at Caius College in October 1839. Green's second paper, which concerned by attraction of ellipsoids, was positively received by William Whewell, a key figure at Cambridge. However, Whewell urged Green to turn his attention to problems whose solutions could serve the "purposes of advancing physical science" instead. Green heeded this advice.

He dismissed his paper on the motion of a pendulum in a fluid as "unimportant" because he feared that Friedrich Wilhelm Bessel might have found the solution before him. However, later scholars did not share this opinion.

His 1837 paper on the motion of waves in a shallow canal (resulting in what is known as Green's law) of variable width and depth anticipates a method for approximating solutions to linear differential equations, rediscovered by Harold Jeffreys, Gregor Wentzel, Hans Kramers, Léon Brillouin in the 1920s. The last three were studying the Schrödinger equation in quantum mechanics. Joseph Liouville independently discovered the same method in the same year. However, the Liouville–Green approximation is now commonly known as the WKBJ method. In modern language, this method involves the use of an asymptotic series. In an other paper on waves in deep water, he corrected Newton's formula for wave speed and noted that a particle on the surface of deep water executed periodic motion. George Gabriel Stokes admired Green's papers on hydrodynamics and frequently cited them in his own work.

In a paper on elasticity, which he was motivated to study in connection with the luminiferous aether, he introduced the Cauchy–Green tensor. He showed that the 21 moduli required to fully account for the elastic properties of an anisotropic medium could be reduced by considerations of symmetry. Augustus Love ranked this paper as equal in importance to the publication of the general equations of motion for elastic bodies.

He stated the principle of conservation of energy in a paper on the refraction and reflection of light, including total internal reflection, as solutions to a boundary-value problem. He was the first to state the minimization principle in connection with what Lord Kelvin and Peter Guthrie Tait referred to as "Green's problem" in 1883, though this is now known as the Dirichlet's principle following Riemann.

== Death ==
He fell ill and returned to Nottingham in the spring of 1840. He died on 31 May the following year of influenza. No known portraits of him exist.

== Posthumous fame and legacy ==
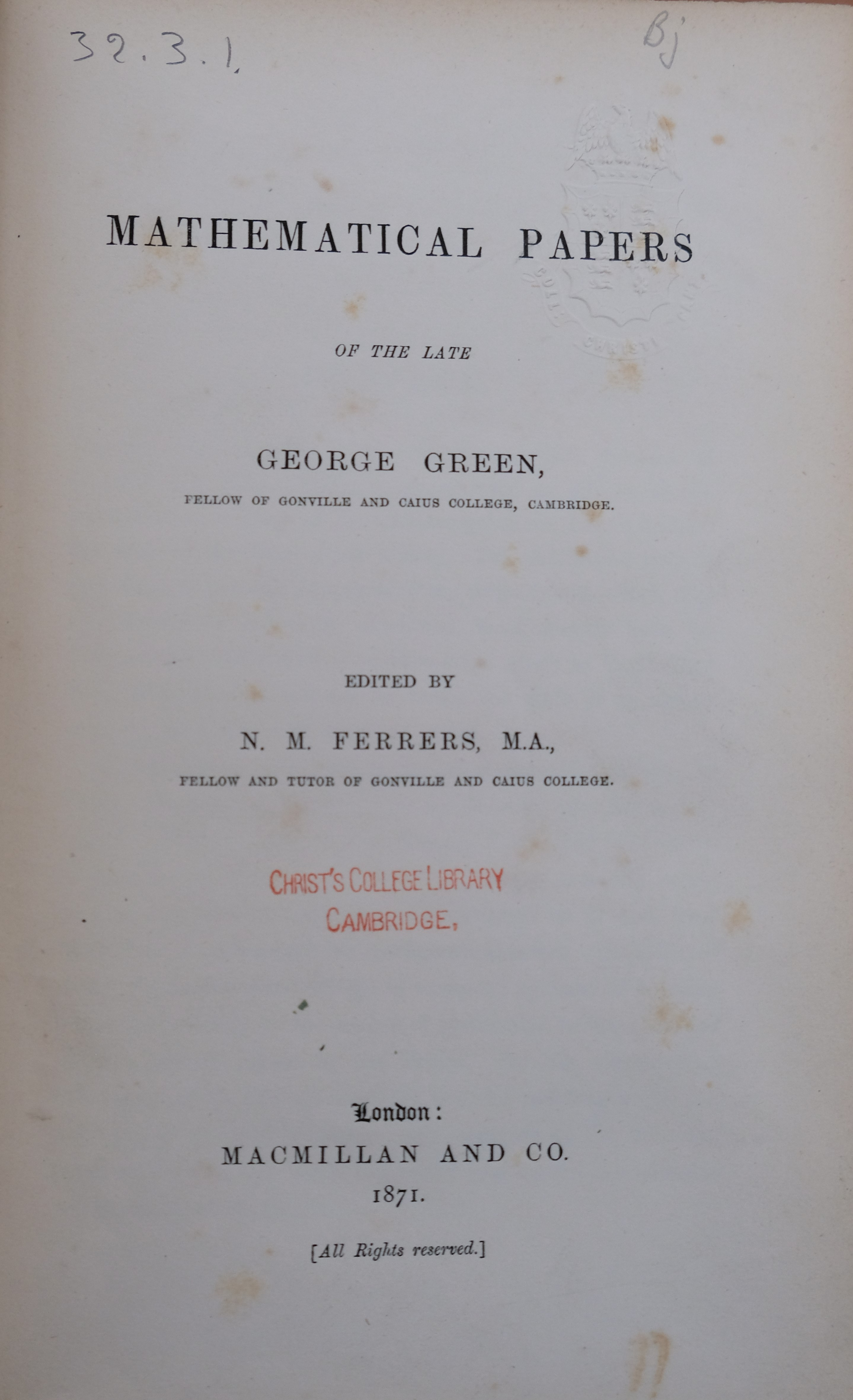
Title page of a 1871 copy of the Mathematical Papers of the Late George Green

Green's work was not well known in the mathematical community during his lifetime. Besides Green himself, the first mathematician to quote his 1828 work was the Briton Robert Murphy (1806–1843) in his 1833 work on integrals, where Green's contributions were mentioned in a footnote.

In 1845, four years after Green's death, Green's work was rediscovered by the newly graduated William Thomson (then aged 21), later known as Lord Kelvin. Thomson became aware of Green's Essay after reading the aforementioned paper by Murphy, but to his dismay, could not find any Cambridge booksellers who even remembered it. But by chance, just before leaving for Paris to work at the laboratory of Victor Regnault, Thomson met his former tutor, William Hopkins. Hopkins took Thomson home and gave him three copies, which he had acquired from Green himself.

As Lord Kelvin recalled in a letter to Joseph Larmor shortly before his death in 1907, "I had only time that evening to look at some pages of it, which astonished me." Kelvin showed Green's Essay to his French colleagues, including Michel Chasles, Joseph Liouville, and Jacques Charles François Sturm, who "gave great attention" to it. Chasles and Sturm noted that Green had anticipated some of their work. Indeed, Green's Essay proved to be a sensation in France and was published in Crelle's Journal in three parts, in 1850, 1852, and 1854. By the turn of the century, Green's functions had become well known among German mathematicians, thanks to Carl Gottfried Neumann and Georg Friedrich Bernhard Riemann, who gave them that name. Green's functions were commonly used to solve differential equations modeling mechanical, electromagnetic, and thermal phenomena, such as the scattering of classical waves.

It was discovered during the 1970s that copies of Green's papers, then in private hands, were once sent by Green to Carl Gustav Jacob Jacobi. It was not in Green's nature to send his papers unsolicited. In Britain, however, Green's Essay was not reprinted until 1871, when Norman Macleod Ferrers assembled The Mathematical Papers of the late George Green for publication.

For his part, Lord Kelvin continued to be an enthusiast of Green's work and used it in his own research on electricity and magnetism, such as the method of images, inspired by Green's theorem, which he so named. According to Edmund Taylor Whittaker, it was "no exaggeration to describe Green as the founder of that Cambridge School" of mathematical physics, which included Kelvin, George Gabriel Stokes, William Strutt (Lord Rayleigh), James Clerk Maxwell, Larmor, Horace Lamb, and Augustus Edward Hough Love, some of the most outstanding scholars of the second half of the nineteenth century.

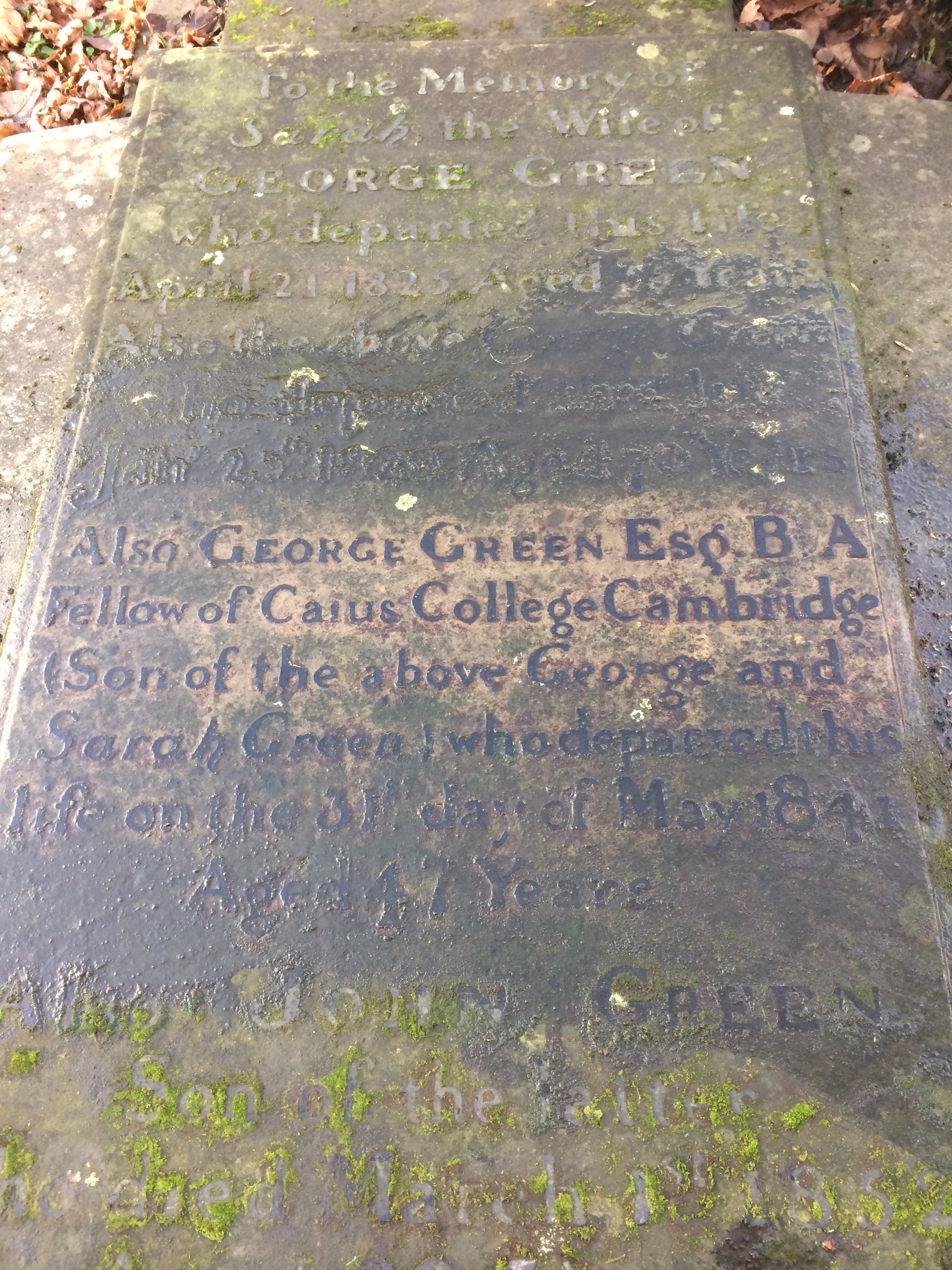
George Green and his common-law wife Jane were buried in St Stephen's Church, a few hundred yards from the Mill.

Though conceived in the context of classical electrostatics, Green's functions are quite useful in modern physics. The formal solution to the Schrödinger equation could be expressed in terms of a Green's function and evaluated iteratively using the Born approximation. At the hands of Julian Schwinger and Freeman Dyson in the 1940s, Green's functions became standard tools of quantum electrodynamics (QED). Schwinger, who had previously employed Green's functions in his research on the propagation of microwaves, published a tribute entitled "The Greening of Quantum Field Theory: George and I" in 1993. Richard Feynman's formulation of QED in terms of path integrals and his diagrams also employed Green's functions, which, in the context of particle physics, are known as Feynman propagators. During the 1950s and '60s, Green's functions were used to solve problems in condensed-matter physics by Ryogo Kubo and others. Green's functions are linked with the controversial Dirac delta-function, whose legitimacy was finally settled in the mid-twentieth century by Laurent Schwartz's theory of distributions (or generalized functions).

Green's requirement that potential functions be invariant under an infinitesimal rotation was developed into great generality six decades later by Sophus Lie.

The George Green Library at the University of Nottingham is named after him, and houses the majority of the university's science and engineering Collection. The George Green Institute for Electromagnetics Research, a research group in the University of Nottingham engineering department, is also named after him. In 1985, Green's Mill, in Sneinton, Nottingham was restored to working order. It now serves both as a working example of a 19th-century windmill and as a museum and science centre dedicated to Green.

His work and influence on 19th-century applied physics had been largely forgotten before H. Gwynedd Green (no relations), a member of the Department of Mathematics at the University of Nottingham, wrote a biography of him in 1945. Mary Cannell published a more substantial account in 1993; the second enlarged edition appeared in 2001.

Westminster Abbey has a memorial stone for Green in the nave adjoining the graves of Isaac Newton and Lord Kelvin, and within proximity to the memorial plaques of Michael Faraday and James Clerk Maxwell. It was unveiled in 1993, on the bicentennial anniversary of his birth, by then president of the Royal Society, Michael Atiyah.

== List of publications ==
- An Essay on the Application of Mathematical Analysis to the Theories of Electricity and Magnetism. By George Green, Nottingham. Printed for the Author by T. Wheelhouse, Nottingham. 1828. (Quarto, vii + 72 pages.)
- Green, George (1835). "Mathematical investigations concerning the laws of the equilibrium of fluids analogous to the electric fluid, with other similar researches". Transactions of the Cambridge Philosophical Society. 5 (part i): 1–63. Presented 12 November 1832.
- Green, George (1835). "On the determination of the exterior and interior attractions of ellipsoids of variable densities". Transactions of the Cambridge Philosophical Society. 5 (part iii): 395–429. Bibcode:1835TCaPS...5..395G. Presented 6 May 1833.
- Green, George (1836). "Researches on the vibration of pendulums in fluid media". Transactions of the Royal Society of Edinburgh. 13 (1): 54–62. doi:10.1017/S0080456800022183. S2CID 124762445. Presented 16 December 1833.
- Green, George (1838). "On the reflexion and refraction of sound". Transactions of the Cambridge Philosophical Society. 6 (part iii): 403–413. Bibcode:1838TCaPS...6..403G. Presented 11 December 1837.
- Green, George (1838). "On the motion of waves in a variable canal of small depth and width". Transactions of the Cambridge Philosophical Society. 6 (part iii): 457–462. Bibcode:1838TCaPS...6..457G. Presented 15 May 1837.
- Green, George (1842). "On the laws of the reflexion and refraction of light at the common surface of two non-crystallized media". Transactions of the Cambridge Philosophical Society. 7 (part i): 1–24. Presented 11 December 1837.
- Green, George (1842). "Note on the motion of waves in canals". Transactions of the Cambridge Philosophical Society. 7 (part i): 87–95. Presented 18 February 1839.
- Green, George (1842). "Supplement to a memoir on the reflection and refraction of light". Transactions of the Cambridge Philosophical Society. 7 (part i): 113–120. Presented 6 May 1839.
- Green, George (1842). "On the propagation of light in crystallized media". Transactions of the Cambridge Philosophical Society. 7 (part ii): 121–140. Presented 20 May 1839.
