= Green measure =

In mathematics — specifically, in stochastic analysis — the Green measure is a measure associated to an Itō diffusion. There is an associated Green formula representing suitably smooth functions in terms of the Green measure and first exit times of the diffusion. The concepts are named after the British mathematician George Green and are generalizations of the classical Green's function and Green formula to the stochastic case using Dynkin's formula.

== Notation ==
Let X be an R^{n}-valued Itō diffusion satisfying an Itō stochastic differential equation of the form

$$\mathrm{d} X_{t} = b(X_{t}) \, \mathrm{d} t + \sigma (X_{t}) \, \mathrm{d} B_{t}.$$

Let P^{x} denote the law of X given the initial condition X_{0} = x, and let E^{x} denote expectation with respect to P^{x}. Let L_{X} be the infinitesimal generator of X, i.e.

$$L_{X} = \sum_{i} b_{i} \frac{\partial}{\partial x_{i}} + \frac1{2} \sum_{i, j} \big( \sigma \sigma^{\top} \big)_{i, j} \frac{\partial^{2}}{\partial x_{i} \, \partial x_{j}}.$$

Let D ⊆ R^{n} be an open, bounded domain; let τ_{D} be the first exit time of X from D:

$$\tau_{D} := \inf \{ t \geq 0 | X_{t} \not \in D \}.$$

== The Green measure ==
Intuitively, the Green measure of a Borel set H (with respect to a point x and domain D) is the expected length of time that X, having started at x, stays in H before it leaves the domain D. That is, the Green measure of X with respect to D at x, denoted G(x, ⋅), is defined for Borel sets H ⊆ R^{n} by

$$G(x, H) = \mathbf{E}^{x} \left[ \int_{0}^{\tau_{D}} \chi_{H} (X_{s}) \, \mathrm{d} s \right],$$

or for bounded, continuous functions f : D → R by

$$\int_{D} f(y) \, G(x, \mathrm{d} y) = \mathbf{E}^{x} \left[ \int_{0}^{\tau_{D}} f(X_{s}) \, \mathrm{d} s \right]$$

The name "Green measure" comes from the fact that if X is Brownian motion, then

$$G(x, H) = \int_{H} G(x, y) \, \mathrm{d} y,$$

where G(x, y) is Green's function for the operator L_{X} (which, in the case of Brownian motion, is 1/2Δ, where Δ is the Laplace operator) on the domain D.

== The Green formula ==
Suppose that E^{x}[τ_{D}] < +∞ for all x ∈ D, and let f : R^{n} → R be of smoothness class C^{2} with compact support. Then

$$f(x) = \mathbf{E}^{x} \big[ f \big( X_{\tau_{D}} \big) \big] - \int_{D} L_{X} f (y) \, G(x, \mathrm{d} y).$$

In particular, for C^{2} functions f with support compactly embedded in D,

$$f(x) = - \int_{D} L_{X} f (y) \, G(x, \mathrm{d} y).$$

The proof of Green's formula is an easy application of Dynkin's formula and the definition of the Green measure:

$\mathbf{E}^{x} \big[ f \big( X_{\tau_{D}} \big) \big]$

$$= f(x) + \mathbf{E}^{x} \left[ \int_{0}^{\tau_{D}} L_{X} f (X_{s}) \, \mathrm{d} s \right]$$
$$= f(x) + \int_{D} L_{X} f (y) \, G(x, \mathrm{d} y).$$
