= An Essay on the Application of Mathematical Analysis to the Theories of Electricity and Magnetism =

1828 essay by George Green

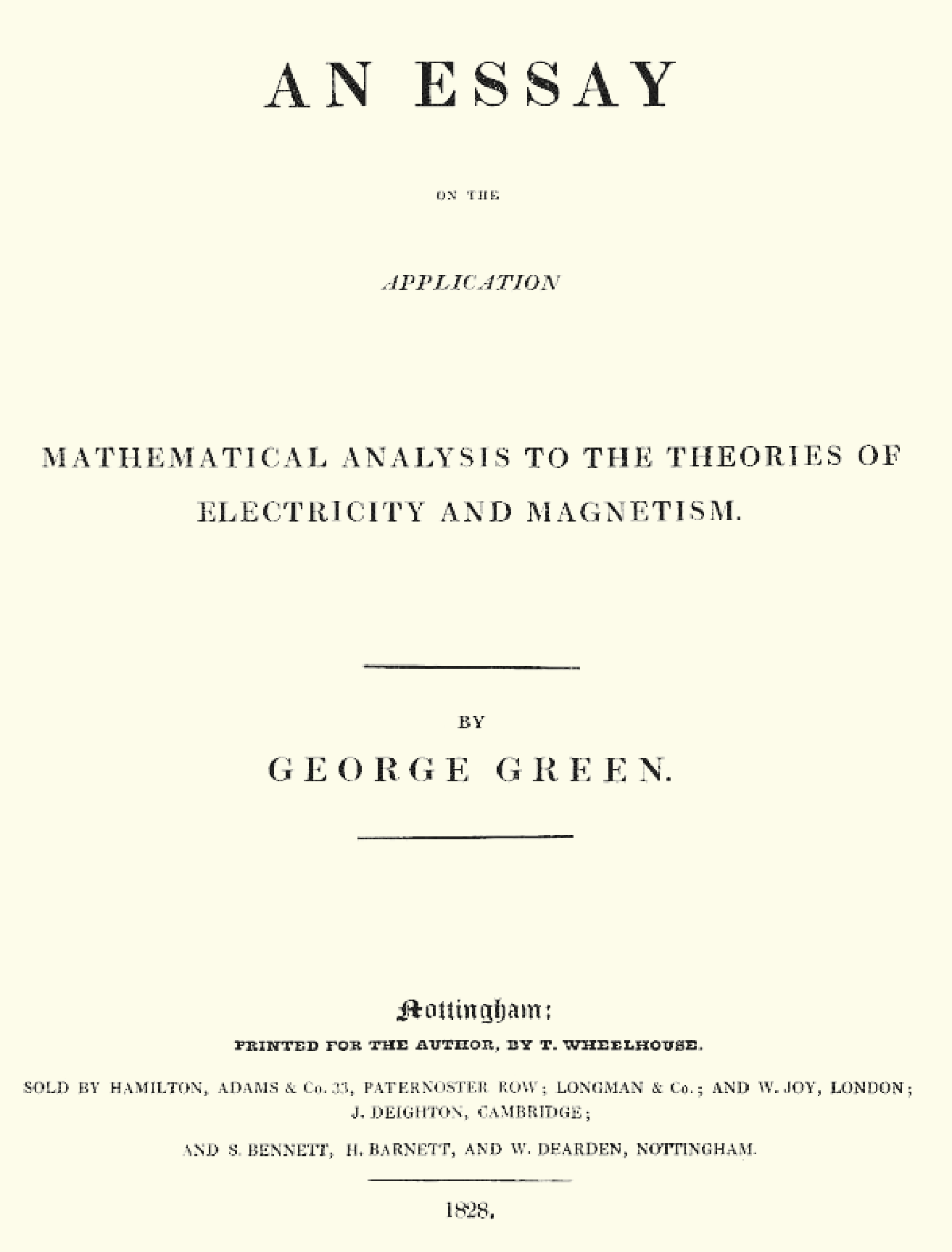
The title page to George Green's original essay on what is now known as Green's theorem. It was published privately at the author's expense, because he thought it would be presumptuous for a person like himself, with no formal education in mathematics, to submit the paper to an established journal.

"An Essay on the Application of Mathematical Analysis to the Theories of Electricity and Magnetism" is a fundamental publication by George Green in 1828, where he extends previous work of Siméon Denis Poisson on electricity and magnetism. The work in mathematical analysis, notably including what is now universally known as Green's theorem, is of the greatest importance in all branches of mathematical physics. It contains the first exposition of the theory of potential. In physics, Green's theorem is mostly used to solve two-dimensional flow integrals, stating that the sum of fluid outflows at any point inside a volume is equal to the total outflow summed about an enclosing area. In plane geometry, and in particular, area surveying, Green's theorem can be used to determine the area and centroid of plane figures solely by integrating over the perimeter.

It is in this essay that the term 'potential function' first occurs. Herein also his remarkable theorem in pure mathematics, since universally known as Green's theorem, and probably the most important instrument of investigation in the whole range of mathematical physics, made its appearance. We are all now able to understand, in a general way at least, the importance of Green's work, and the progress made since the publication of his essay in 1828. But to fully appreciate his work and subsequent progress one needs to know the outlook for the mathematico-physical sciences as it appeared to Green at this time and to realize his refined sensitiveness in promulgating his discoveries.

== Overview ==
Poisson's electrical and magnetical investigations were generalized and extended in 1828 by George Green. Green's treatment is based on the properties of the function already used by Lagrange, Laplace, and Poisson, which represents the sum of all the electric or magnetic charges in the field, divided by their respective distances from some given point: to this function Green gave the name potential, by which it has always since been known.

In 1828, Green published the paper which is the essay he is most famous for today. When Green published his Essay, it was sold on a subscription basis to 51 people, most of whom were friends and probably could not understand it. The wealthy landowner and mathematician Edward Bromhead bought a copy and encouraged Green to do further work in mathematics. Not believing the offer was sincere, Green did not contact Bromhead for two years.

Upon publishing the work, he first introduced the term 'potential' to denote the result obtained by adding the masses of all the particles of a system, each divided by its distance from a given point; and the properties of this function are first considered and applied to the theories of magnetism and electricity. This was followed by two papers communicated by Sir Edward to the Cambridge Philosophical Society: (1)' On the Laws of the Equilibrium of Fluids analogous to the Electric Fluid ' (12 Nov. 1832); (2)' On the Determination of the Attractions of Ellipsoids of Variable Densities ' (6 May 1833). Both papers display great analytical power, but are rather curious than practically interesting. Green's 1828 essay was neglected by mathematicians till 1846, and before that time most of its important theorems had been rediscovered by Carl Friedrich Gauss, Michel Chasles, Jacques Charles François Sturm, and Thomson J. It did influence the work of Lord Kelvin and James Clerk Maxwell.

The self-taught mathematician's essay was one of the greatest advances that were made in the mathematical theory of electricity up to his time. "His researches," as Sir William Thomson has observed, "have led to the elementary proposition which must constitute the legitimate foundation of every perfect mathematical structure that is to be made from the materials furnished in the experimental laws of Coulomb. Not only do they afford a natural and complete explanation of the beautiful quantitative experiments which has been so interesting at all times to practical electricians, but they suggest to the mathematician the simplest and most powerful methods of dealing with problems which, if attacked by the mere force of the old analysis, must have remained forever unsolved."

Near the beginning of the memoir is established the celebrated formula connecting surface and volume integrals, which is now generally called Green's Theorem, and of which Poisson's result on the equivalent surface – and volume – distributions of magnetization is a particular application. By using this theorem to investigate the properties of the potential, Green arrived at many results of remarkable beauty and interest. We need only mention, as an example of the power of his method, the following: — Suppose that there is a hollow conducting shell, bounded by two closed surfaces, and that a number of electrified bodies are placed, some within and some without it; and let the inner surface and interior bodies be called the interior system, and the outer surface and exterior bodies be called the exterior system. Then all the electrical phenomena of the interior system, relative to attractions, repulsions, and densities, will be the same as if there were no exterior system, and the inner surface were a perfect conductor, put in communication with the earth; and all those of the exterior system will be the same as if the interior system did not exist, and the outer surface were a perfect conductor, containing a quantity of electricity equal to the whole of that originally contained in the shell itself and in all the interior bodies. It will be evident that electrostatics had by this time attained a state of development in which further progress could be hoped for only in the mathematical superstructure, unless experiment should unexpectedly bring to light phenomena of an entirely new character.

One of the simplest applications of these theorems was to perfect the theory of the Leyden phial, a result which (if we except the peculiar action of the insulating solid medium, since discovered by Michael Faraday) we owe to his genius. He has also shown how an infinite number of forms of conductors may be invented, so that the distribution of electricity in equilibrium on each may be expressible in finite algebraic terms – an immense stride in the science, when we consider that the distribution of electricity on a single spherical conductor, an uninfluenced ellipsoidal conductor, and two spheres mutually influencing one another, were the only cases solved by Poisson, and indeed the only cases conceived to be solvable by mathematical writers.

== Editions ==
- Essay on the Application of Mathematical Analysis to the Theories of Electricity and Magnetism, Nottingham, 1828.

== See also ==
- Mathematical analysis
- Vector calculus
- Partial differential equation
