= Stochastic processes and boundary value problems =

In mathematics, some boundary value problems can be solved using the methods of stochastic analysis. Perhaps the most celebrated example is Shizuo Kakutani's 1944 solution of the Dirichlet problem for the Laplace operator using Brownian motion. However, it turns out that for a large class of semi-elliptic second-order partial differential equations the associated Dirichlet boundary value problem can be solved using an Itō process that solves an associated stochastic differential equation.

== History ==
The link between semi-elliptic operators and stochastic processes, followed by their use to solve boundary value problems, is repeatedly and independently rediscovered in the early-mid-20th century.

The connection that Kakutani makes between stochastic differential equations and the Itō process is effectively the same as Kolmogorov's forward equation, made in 1931, which is only later recognized as the Fokker–Planck equation, first presented in 1914-1917. The solution of a boundary value problem by means of expectation values over stochastic processes is now more commonly known not under Kakutani's name, but as the Feynman–Kac formula, developed in 1947.

These results are founded on the use of the Itō integral, required to integrate a stochastic process. But this is also independently rediscovered as the Stratonovich integral; the two forms can be translated into one-another by an offset.

== Introduction: Kakutani's solution to the classical Dirichlet problem ==
Let $D$ be a domain (an open and connected set) in $\mathbb{R}^{n}$. Let $\Delta$ be the Laplace operator, let $g$ be a bounded function on the boundary $\partial D$, and consider the problem:

$$\begin{cases} - \Delta u(x) = 0, & x \in D \\ \displaystyle{\lim_{y \to x} u(y)} = g(x), & x \in \partial D \end{cases}$$

It can be shown that if a solution $u$ exists, then $u(x)$ is the expected value of $g(x)$ at the (random) first exit point from $D$ for a canonical Brownian motion starting at $x$. See theorem 3 in Kakutani 1944, p. 710.

== The Dirichlet–Poisson problem ==
Let $D$ be a domain in $\mathbb{R}^{n}$ and let $L$ be a semi-elliptic differential operator on $C^{2}(\mathbb{R}^{n};\mathbb{R})$ of the form:

$$L = \sum_{i = 1}^{n} b_{i} (x) \frac{\partial}{\partial x_{i}} + \sum_{i, j = 1}^{n} a_{ij} (x) \frac{\partial^{2}}{\partial x_{i} \, \partial x_{j}}$$

where the coefficients $b_{i}$ and $a_{ij}$ are continuous functions and all the eigenvalues of the matrix $\alpha(x) = a_{ij}(x)$ are non-negative. Let $f\in C(D;\mathbb{R})$ and $g\in C(\partial D;\mathbb{R})$. Consider the Poisson problem:

$$\begin{cases} - L u(x) = f(x), & x \in D \\ \displaystyle{\lim_{y \to x} u(y)} = g(x), & x \in \partial D \end{cases} \quad \mbox{(P1)}$$

The idea of the stochastic method for solving this problem is as follows. First, one finds an Itō diffusion $X$ whose infinitesimal generator $A$ coincides with $L$ on compactly-supported $C^{2}$ functions $f:\mathbb{R}^{n}\rightarrow \mathbb{R}$. For example, $X$ can be taken to be the solution to the stochastic differential equation:

$$\mathrm{d} X_{t} = b(X_{t}) \, \mathrm{d} t + \sigma (X_{t}) \, \mathrm{d} B_{t}$$

where $B$ is n-dimensional Brownian motion, $b$ has components $b_{i}$ as above, and the matrix field $\sigma$ is chosen so that:

$$\frac1{2} \sigma (x) \sigma(x)^{\top} = a(x), \quad \forall x \in\mathbb{R}^{n}$$

For a point $x\in\mathbb{R}^{n}$, let $\mathbb{P}^{x}$ denote the law of $X$ given initial datum $X_{0} = x$, and let $\mathbb{E}^{x}$denote expectation with respect to $\mathbb{P}^{x}$. Let $\tau_{D}$ denote the first exit time of $X$ from $D$.

In this notation, the candidate solution for (P1) is:

$$u(x) = \mathbb{E}^{x} \left[ g \big( X_{\tau_{D}} \big) \cdot \chi_{\{ \tau_{D} < + \infty \}} \right] + \mathbb{E}^{x} \left[ \int_{0}^{\tau_{D}} f(X_{t}) \, \mathrm{d} t \right]$$

provided that $g$ is a bounded function and that:

$$\mathbb{E}^{x} \left[ \int_{0}^{\tau_{D}} \big| f(X_{t}) \big| \, \mathrm{d} t \right] < + \infty$$

It turns out that one further condition is required:

$$\mathbb{P}^{x} \big( \tau_{D} < \infty \big) = 1, \quad \forall x \in D$$

For all $x$, the process $X$ starting at $x$ almost surely leaves $D$ in finite time. Under this assumption, the candidate solution above reduces to:

$$u(x) = \mathbb{E}^{x} \left[ g \big( X_{\tau_{D}} \big) \right] + \mathbb{E}^{x} \left[ \int_{0}^{\tau_{D}} f(X_{t}) \, \mathrm{d} t \right]$$

and solves (P1) in the sense that if $\mathcal{A}$ denotes the characteristic operator for $X$ (which agrees with $A$ on $C^{2}$ functions), then:

$$\begin{cases} - \mathcal{A} u(x) = f(x), & x \in D \\ \displaystyle{\lim_{t \uparrow \tau_{D}} u(X_{t})} = g \big( X_{\tau_{D}} \big), & \mathbb{P}^{x} \mbox{-a.s.,} \; \forall x \in D \end{cases} \quad \mbox{(P2)}$$

Moreover, if $v \in C^{2}(D;\mathbb{R})$ satisfies (P2) and there exists a constant $C$ such that, for all $x\in D$:

$$| v(x) | \leq C \left( 1 + \mathbb{E}^{x} \left[ \int_{0}^{\tau_{D}} \big| f(X_{s}) \big| \, \mathrm{d} s \right] \right)$$

then $v=u$.
