= Filtration (mathematics) =

Indexed set in mathematics

In mathematics, a filtration $\mathcal{F}$ is, informally, like a set of ever larger Russian dolls, each one containing the previous ones, where a "doll" is a subobject of an algebraic structure. Formally, a filtration is an indexed family $(S_i)_{i \in I}$ of subobjects of a given algebraic structure $S$, with the index $i$ running over some totally ordered index set $I$, subject to the condition that

if $i\leq j$ in $I$, then $S_i\subseteq S_j$.

If the index $i$ is the time parameter of some stochastic process, then the filtration can be interpreted as representing all historical but not future information available about the stochastic process, with the algebraic structure $S_i$ gaining in complexity with time. Hence, a process that is adapted to a filtration $\mathcal{F}$ is also called non-anticipating, because it cannot "see into the future".

Sometimes, as in a filtered algebra, there is instead the requirement that the $S_i$ be subalgebras with respect to some operations (say, vector addition), but not with respect to other operations (say, multiplication) that satisfy only $S_i \cdot S_j \subseteq S_{i+j}$, where the index set is the natural numbers; this is by analogy with a graded algebra.

Sometimes, filtrations are supposed to satisfy the additional requirement that the union of the $S_i$ be the whole $S$, or (in more general cases, when the notion of union does not make sense) that the canonical homomorphism from the direct limit of the $S_i$ to $S$ is an isomorphism. Whether this requirement is assumed or not usually depends on the author of the text and is often explicitly stated. This article does not impose this requirement.

There is also the notion of a descending filtration, which is required to satisfy $S_i \supseteq S_j$ in lieu of $S_i \subseteq S_j$ (and, occasionally, $\bigcap_{i\in I} S_i=0$ instead of $\bigcup_{i\in I} S_i=S$). Again, it depends on the context how exactly the word "filtration" is to be understood. Descending filtrations are not to be confused with the dual notion of cofiltrations (which consist of quotient objects rather than subobjects).

Filtrations are widely used in abstract algebra, homological algebra (where they are related in an important way to spectral sequences), and in measure theory and probability theory for nested sequences of σ-algebras. In functional analysis and numerical analysis, other terminology is usually used, such as scale of spaces or nested spaces.

== Examples ==
=== Sets ===
Farey Sequence

==== Metrics ====
By applying Dedekind cut in reverse, a function from $S$ to $\mathbb{R}_{\geq 0}$ can be identified with a function $(S_\varepsilon)_{\varepsilon\in\mathbb{Q}_{\geq 0}}$ from $\mathbb{Q}_{\geq 0}$ to $\mathcal{P}(S)$ subject to the covering condition:
$$\bigcup_{\varepsilon\in\mathbb{Q}_{\geq 0}}S_\varepsilon =S$$
and the monotone and right-continuity condition:
$$\bigcap_{\varepsilon<\delta\in\mathbb{Q}_{\geq 0}}S_\delta =S_\varepsilon$$
. The correspondence from the function to the filtration is $d\mapsto (\{(x,y)\in X\times X\mid d(x,y)\leq \varepsilon\})_{\varepsilon\in\mathbb{Q}_{\geq 0}}$ and the correspondence from filtration to the function is $(S_\varepsilon)_{\varepsilon\in\mathbb{Q}_{\geq 0}}\mapsto \big((x,y)\mapsto \text{inf}_\mathbb{R}\{\varepsilon\in\mathbb{Q}_{\geq 0}\mid (x,y)\in S_\varepsilon\}\big)$. In the viewing of above identification applied to a metric function $d:X\times X\rightarrow \mathbb{R}_{\geq 0}$, we can define a metric as a filtration $(S_\varepsilon)_{\varepsilon\in\mathbb{Q}_{\geq 0}}$ that satisfies the covering, monotone, and right-continuity conditions and furthermore

1. $S_0\supseteq\Delta_X$
2. (Positivity) $S_0\subseteq\Delta_X$
3. (Symmetry) $S_\varepsilon\subseteq S_\varepsilon^{\top}$
4. (Triangle inequality) $S_\varepsilon\circ S_\delta\subseteq S_{\varepsilon +\delta}$

=== Algebra ===
==== Algebras ====
See: Filtered algebra

==== Groups ====
In algebra, filtrations are ordinarily indexed by $\mathbb{N}$, the set of natural numbers. A filtration of a group $G$, is then a nested sequence $G_n$ of normal subgroups of $G$ (that is, for any $n$ we have $G_{n+1}\subseteq G_n$). Note that this use of the word "filtration" corresponds to our "descending filtration".

Given a group $G$ and a filtration $G_n$, there is a natural way to define a topology on $G$, said to be associated to the filtration. A basis for this topology is the set of all cosets of subgroups appearing in the filtration, that is, a subset of $G$ is defined to be open if it is a union of sets of the form $aG_n$, where $a\in G$ and $n$ is a natural number.

The topology associated to a filtration on a group $G$ makes $G$ into a topological group.

The topology associated to a filtration $G_n$ on a group $G$ is Hausdorff if and only if $\bigcap G_n=\{1\}$.

If two filtrations $G_n$ and $G'_n$ are defined on a group $G$, then the identity map from $G$ to $G$, where the first copy of $G$ is given the $G_n$-topology and the second the $G'_n$-topology, is continuous if and only if for any $n$ there is an $m$ such that $G_m\subseteq G'_n$, that is, if and only if the identity map is continuous at 1. In particular, the two filtrations define the same topology if and only if for any subgroup appearing in one there is a smaller or equal one appearing in the other.

==== Rings and modules: descending filtrations ====
Given a ring $R$ and an $R$-module $M$, a descending filtration of $M$ is a decreasing sequence of submodules $M_n$. This is therefore a special case of the notion for groups, with the additional condition that the subgroups be submodules. The associated topology is defined as for groups.

An important special case is known as the $I$-adic topology (or $J$-adic, etc.): Let $R$ be a commutative ring, and $I$ an ideal of $R$. Given an $R$-module $M$, the sequence $I^n M$ of submodules of $M$ forms a filtration of $M$ (the $I$-adic filtration). The $I$-adic topology on $M$ is then the topology associated to this filtration. If $M$ is just the ring $R$ itself, we have defined the $I$-adic topology on $R$.

When $R$ is given the $I$-adic topology, $R$ becomes a topological ring. If an $R$-module $M$ is then given the $I$-adic topology, it becomes a topological $R$-module, relative to the topology given on $R$.

==== Rings and modules: ascending filtrations ====
Given a ring $R$ and an $R$-module $M$, an ascending filtration of $M$ is an increasing sequence of submodules $M_n$. In particular, if $R$ is a field, then an ascending filtration of the $R$-vector space $M$ is an increasing sequence of vector subspaces of $M$. Flags are one important class of such filtrations.

==== Sets ====
A maximal filtration of a set is equivalent to an ordering (a permutation) of the set. For instance, the filtration $\{0\} \subseteq \{0,1\} \subseteq \{0,1,2\}$ corresponds to the ordering $(0,1,2)$. From the point of view of the field with one element, an ordering on a set corresponds to a maximal flag (a filtration on a vector space), considering a set to be a vector space over the field with one element.

=== Measure theory ===
In measure theory, in particular in martingale theory and the theory of stochastic processes, a filtration is an increasing sequence of $\sigma$-algebras on a measurable space. That is, given a measurable space $(\Omega, \mathcal{F})$, a filtration is a sequence of $\sigma$-algebras $\{ \mathcal{F}_{t} \}_{t \geq 0}$ with $\mathcal{F}_{t} \subseteq \mathcal{F}$ where each $t$ is a non-negative real number and

$$t_{1} \leq t_{2} \implies \mathcal{F}_{t_{1}} \subseteq \mathcal{F}_{t_{2}}.$$

The exact range of the "times" $t$ will usually depend on context: the set of values for $t$ might be discrete or continuous, bounded or unbounded. For example,

$$t \in \{ 0, 1, \dots, N \}, \mathbb{N}_{0}, [0, T] \mbox{ or } [0, + \infty).$$

Similarly, a filtered probability space (also known as a stochastic basis) $\left(\Omega, \mathcal{F}, \left\{\mathcal{F}_{t}\right\}_{t\geq 0}, \mathbb{P}\right)$, is a probability space equipped with the filtration $\left\{\mathcal{F}_t\right\}_{t\geq 0}$ of its $\sigma$-algebra $\mathcal{F}$. A filtered probability space is said to satisfy the usual conditions if it is complete (i.e., $\mathcal{F}_0$ contains all $\mathbb{P}$-null sets) and right-continuous (i.e. $\mathcal{F}_t = \mathcal{F}_{t+} := \bigcap_{s > t} \mathcal{F}_s$ for all times $t$).

It is also useful (in the case of an unbounded index set) to define $\mathcal{F}_{\infty}$ as the $\sigma$-algebra generated by the infinite union of the $\mathcal{F}_{t}$'s, which is contained in $\mathcal{F}$:

$$\mathcal{F}_{\infty} = \sigma\left(\bigcup_{t \geq 0} \mathcal{F}_{t}\right) \subseteq \mathcal{F}.$$

A σ-algebra defines the set of events that can be measured, which in a probability context is equivalent to events that can be discriminated, or "questions that can be answered at time $t$". Therefore, a filtration is often used to represent the change in the set of events that can be measured, through gain or loss of information. A typical example is in mathematical finance, where a filtration represents the information available up to and including each time $t$, and is more and more precise (the set of measurable events is staying the same or increasing) as more information from the evolution of the stock price becomes available.

==== Relation to stopping times: stopping time sigma-algebras ====
Let $\left(\Omega, \mathcal{F}, \left\{\mathcal{F}_{t}\right\}_{t\geq 0}, \mathbb{P}\right)$ be a filtered probability space. A random variable $\tau : \Omega \rightarrow [0, \infty]$ is a stopping time with respect to the filtration $\left\{\mathcal{F}_{t}\right\}_{t\geq 0}$, if $\{\tau \leq t\} \in \mathcal{F}_t$ for all $t\geq 0$. The stopping time $\sigma$-algebra is now defined as

$$\mathcal{F}_{\tau} := \{A\in\mathcal{F} \vert \forall t\geq 0 \colon A\cap\{\tau \leq t\}\in\mathcal{F}_t\}$$.

It is not difficult to show that $\mathcal{F}_{\tau}$ is indeed a $\sigma$-algebra. The set $\mathcal{F}_{\tau}$ encodes information up to the random time $\tau$ in the sense that, if the filtered probability space is interpreted as a random experiment, the maximum information that can be found out about it from arbitrarily often repeating the experiment until the random time $\tau$ is $\mathcal{F}_{\tau}$. In particular, if the underlying probability space is finite (i.e. $\mathcal{F}$ is finite), the minimal sets of $\mathcal{F}_{\tau}$ (with respect to set inclusion) are given by the union over all $t\geq 0$ of the sets of minimal sets of $\mathcal{F}_{t}$ that lie in $\{\tau = t\}$.

It can be shown that $\tau$ is $\mathcal{F}_{\tau}$-measurable. However, simple examples show that, in general, $\sigma(\tau) \neq \mathcal{F}_{\tau}$. If $\tau_ 1$ and $\tau_ 2$ are stopping times on $\left(\Omega, \mathcal{F}, \left\{\mathcal{F}_{t}\right\}_{t\geq 0}, \mathbb{P}\right)$, and $\tau_1 \leq \tau_2$ almost surely, then $\mathcal{F}_{\tau_1} \subseteq \mathcal{F}_{\tau_2}.$

== See also ==
- Natural filtration
- Filtration (probability theory)
- Filter (mathematics)
