= Σ-Algebra of τ-past =

Algebra of a branch of probability theory

The σ-algebra of τ-past, (also named stopped σ-algebra, stopped σ-field, or σ-field of τ-past) is a σ-algebra associated with a stopping time in the theory of stochastic processes, a branch of probability theory.

== Definition ==
Let $\tau$ be a stopping time on the filtered probability space $(\Omega, \mathcal A, (\mathcal F_t)_{t \in T}, P )$. Then the σ-algebra

$$\mathcal F_\tau:= \{ A \in \mathcal A \mid \forall t \in T \colon \{ \tau \leq t \} \cap A \in \mathcal F_t\}$$

is called the σ-algebra of τ-past.

== Properties ==
=== Monotonicity ===
If $\sigma, \tau$ are two stopping times and

$$\sigma \leq \tau$$

almost surely, then

$$\mathcal F_\sigma \subset \mathcal F_\tau.$$

=== Measurability ===
A stopping time $\tau$ is always $\mathcal F_\tau$-measurable.

== Intuition ==
The same way $\mathcal{F}_t$ is all the information up to time $t$, $\mathcal{F}_\tau$ is all the information up to time $\tau$. The only difference is that $\tau$ is random. For example, if you had a random walk, and you wanted to ask, “How many times did the random walk hit −5 before it first hit 10?”, then letting $\tau$ be the first time the random walk hit 10, $\mathcal{F}_\tau$ would give you the information to answer that question.
