= Dynkin's formula =

Theorem in stochastic analysis

In mathematics — specifically, in stochastic analysis — Dynkin's formula is a theorem giving the expected value of any suitably smooth function applied to a Feller process at a stopping time. It may be seen as a stochastic generalization of the (second) fundamental theorem of calculus. It is named after the Russian mathematician Eugene Dynkin.

== Statement of the theorem ==
Let $X$ be a Feller process with infinitesimal generator $A$. For a point $x$ in the state-space of $X$, let $\mathbf P^x$ denote the law of $X$ given initial datum $X_0=x$, and let $\mathbf E^x$ denote expectation with respect to $\mathbf P^x$. Then for any function $f$ in the domain of $A$, and any stopping time $\tau$ with $\mathbf E[\tau]<+\infty$, Dynkin's formula holds:

$$\mathbf{E}^{x} [f(X_{\tau})] = f(x) + \mathbf{E}^{x} \left[ \int_{0}^{\tau} A f (X_{s}) \, \mathrm{d} s \right].$$

== Example: Itô diffusions ==
Let $X$ be the $\mathbf R^n$-valued Itô diffusion solving the stochastic differential equation

$$\mathrm{d} X_{t} = b(X_{t}) \, \mathrm{d} t + \sigma (X_{t}) \, \mathrm{d} B_{t}.$$

The infinitesimal generator $A$ of $X$ is defined by its action on compactly-supported $C^2$ (twice differentiable with continuous second derivative) functions $f:\mathbf R^n \to \mathbf R$ as

$$A f (x) = \lim_{t \downarrow 0} \frac{\mathbf{E}^{x} [f(X_{t})] - f(x)}{t}$$

or, equivalently,

$$A f (x) = \sum_{i} b_{i} (x) \frac{\partial f}{\partial x_{i}} (x) + \frac1{2} \sum_{i, j} \big( \sigma \sigma^{\top} \big)_{i, j} (x) \frac{\partial^{2} f}{\partial x_{i}\, \partial x_{j}} (x).$$

Since this $X$ is a Feller process, Dynkin's formula holds. In fact, if $\tau$ is the first exit time of a bounded set $B\subset\mathbf R^n$ with $\mathbf E[\tau]<+\infty$, then Dynkin's formula holds for all $C^2$ functions $f$, without the assumption of compact support.

== Application: Brownian motion exiting the ball ==
Dynkin's formula can be used to find the expected first exit time $\tau_K$ of a Brownian motion $B$ from the closed ball $K= \{ x \in \mathbf{R}^{n} : \, | x | \leq R \},$ which, when $B$ starts at a point $a$ in the interior of $K$, is given by

$$\mathbf{E}^{a} [\tau_{K}] = \frac1{n} \big( R^{2} - | a |^{2} \big).$$

This is shown as follows. Fix an integer j. The strategy is to apply Dynkin's formula with $X=B$, $\tau=\sigma_j=\min\{j,\tau_K\}$, and a compactly-supported $f\in C^2$ with $f(x)=|x|^2$ on $K$. The generator of Brownian motion is $\Delta/2$, where $\Delta$ denotes the Laplacian operator. Therefore, by Dynkin's formula,

$$\begin{align}
\mathbf{E}^{a} \left[ f \big( B_{\sigma_{j}} \big) \right]
&= f(a) + \mathbf{E}^{a} \left[ \int_{0}^{\sigma_{j}} \frac1{2} \Delta f (B_{s}) \, \mathrm{d} s \right] \\
&= | a |^{2} + \mathbf{E}^{a} \left[ \int_{0}^{\sigma_{j}} n \, \mathrm{d} s \right]
= | a |^{2} + n \mathbf{E}^{a} [\sigma_{j}].
\end{align}$$

Hence, for any $j$,

$$\mathbf{E}^{a} [\sigma_{j}] \leq \frac1{n} \big( R^{2} - | a |^{2} \big).$$

Now let $j\to+\infty$ to conclude that $\tau_K=\lim_{j\to+\infty}\sigma_j<+\infty$ almost surely, and so $\mathbf{E}^{a} [\tau_{K}] =( R^{2} - | a |^{2})/n$ as claimed.
