= William Feller =

Croatian–American mathematician

- Born: Vilibald Srećko Feller; July 7, 1906; Zagreb, Austro-Hungarian Monarchy (now Croatia)
- Died: January 14, 1970 (aged 63); New York City, US
- Education: University of Zagreb; University of Göttingen
- Known for: Feller process Feller's coin-tossing constants Feller-continuous process Feller's paradox Feller's theorem Feller–Pareto distribution Feller–Tornier constant Feller–Miyadera–Phillips theorem Proof by intimidation
- Awards: National Medal of Science (USA) in Mathematical, Statistical, and Computational Sciences (1969)
- Scientific career
- Fields: Mathematician
- Workplaces: University of Kiel; University of Copenhagen; Stockholm University; University of Lund; Brown University; Cornell University; Princeton University
- Doctoral advisor: Richard Courant
- Doctoral students: Patrick Billingsley; Brian H. Murdoch; George Forsythe; Henry McKean; Lawrence Shepp; Hale Trotter; Benjamin Weiss; David A. Freedman; Loren Pitt

Signature
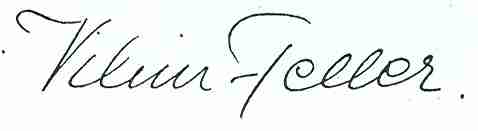

William "Vilim" Feller (July 7, 1906 – January 14, 1970), born Vilibald Srećko Feller, was a Croatian–American mathematician specializing in probability theory.

== Early life and education ==
Feller was born in Zagreb to Ida Oemichen-Perc, a Croatian–Austrian Catholic, and Eugen Viktor Feller, son of a Polish–Jewish father (David Feller) and an Austrian mother (Elsa Holzer).

Eugen Feller was a famous chemist and created Elsa fluid named after his mother. According to Gian-Carlo Rota, Eugen Feller's surname was a "Slavic tongue twister", which William changed at the age of twenty. This claim appears to be false. His forename, Vilibald, was chosen by his Catholic mother for the saint day of his birthday.

== Career and later life ==
Feller held a docent position at the University of Kiel beginning in 1928. Because he refused to sign a Nazi oath, he fled the Nazis and went to Copenhagen, Denmark in 1933. He also lectured in Sweden (Stockholm and Lund). As a refugee in Sweden, Feller reported being troubled by increasing fascism at the universities. He reported that the mathematician Torsten Carleman would offer his opinion that Jews and foreigners should be executed.

After marrying a former student from Kiel, Clara Mary Nielsen, in 1938, he moved with her to the US in 1939. In that year he joined Brown University as an associate professor; he became a US citizen in 1944. He moved to Cornell University in 1945 and to Princeton University in 1950. At Princeton, he became Eugene Higgins Professor of Mathematics. He remained there until his death on January 14, 1970.

== Work ==
The works of Feller are contained in 104 papers and two books on a variety of topics such as mathematical analysis, theory of measurement, functional analysis, geometry, and differential equations in addition to his work in mathematical statistics and probability.

Feller was one of the greatest probabilists of the twentieth century. He is remembered for his championing of probability theory as a branch of mathematical analysis in Sweden and the United States. In the middle of the 20th century, probability theory was popular in France and Russia, while mathematical statistics was more popular in the United Kingdom and the United States, according to the Swedish statistician, Harald Cramér. His two-volume textbook on probability theory and its applications was called "the most successful treatise on probability ever written" by Gian-Carlo Rota. By stimulating his colleagues and students in Sweden and then in the United States, Feller helped establish research groups studying the analytic theory of probability. In his research, Feller contributed to the study of the relationship between Markov chains and differential equations, where his theory of generators of one-parameter semigroups of stochastic processes gave rise to the theory of "Feller operators".

Numerous topics relating to probability are named after him, including Feller processes, Feller's explosion test, Feller–Brown movement, and the Lindeberg–Feller theorem. Feller made fundamental contributions to renewal theory, Tauberian theorems, random walks, diffusion processes, and the law of the iterated logarithm. Feller was among those early editors who launched the journal Mathematical Reviews.

== Books ==
- An Introduction to Probability Theory and its Applications, Volume I, 3rd edition (1968); 1st edn. (1950); 2nd edn. (1957)
- An Introduction to Probability Theory and its Applications, Volume II, 2nd edition (1971)

== Recognition ==
In 1949, Feller was named a Fellow of the American Statistical Association. He was elected to the American Academy of Arts and Sciences in 1958, the United States National Academy of Sciences in 1960, and the American Philosophical Society in 1966. Feller won the National Medal of Science in 1969. He was president of the Institute of Mathematical Statistics.

== See also ==
- Feller condition
- Beta distribution
- Compound Poisson distribution
- Gillespie algorithm
- Kolmogorov equations
- Poisson point process
- Stability (probability)
- St. Petersburg paradox
- Stochastic process
