= Hitting time =

Aspect of stochastic processes

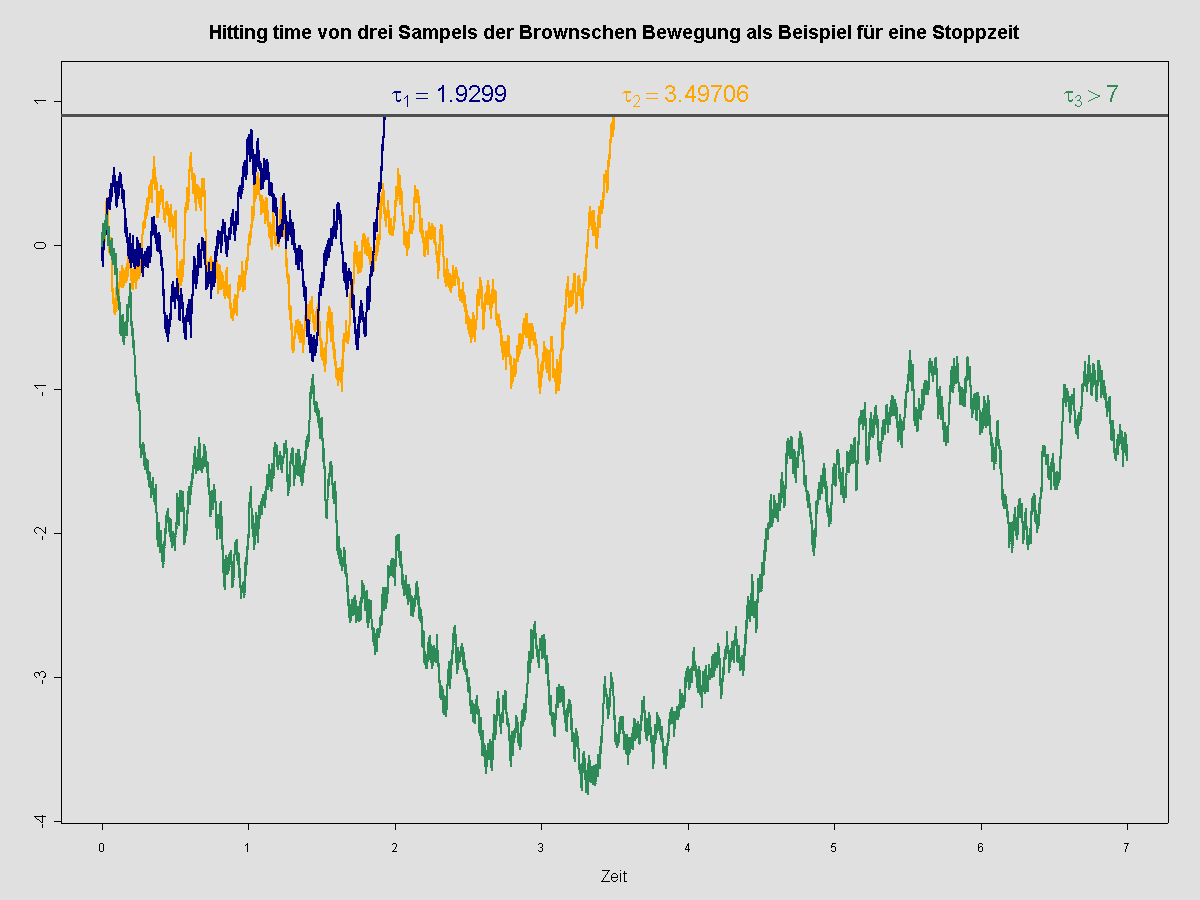
The Hitting times and stopping times of three samples of Brownian motion.

In the study of stochastic processes in mathematics, a hitting time (or first hit time) is the first time at which a given process "hits" a given subset of the state space. Exit times and return times are also examples of hitting times.

== Definitions ==
Let T be an ordered index set such as the natural numbers, $\N,$ the non-negative real numbers, [0, +∞), or a subset of these; elements $t \in T$ can be thought of as "times". Given a probability space (Ω, Σ, Pr) and a measurable state space S, let $X :\Omega \times T \to S$ be a stochastic process, and let A be a measurable subset of the state space S. Then the first hit time $\tau_A : \Omega \to [0, +\infty]$ is the random variable defined by

$$\tau_A (\omega) := \inf \{ t \in T \mid X_t (\omega) \in A \}.$$

The first exit time (from A) is defined to be the first hit time for S \ A, the complement of A in S. Confusingly, this is also often denoted by τ_{A}.

The first return time is defined to be the first hit time for the singleton set {X_{0}(ω)}, which is usually a given deterministic element of the state space, such as the origin of the coordinate system.

== Examples ==
- Any stopping time is a hitting time for a properly chosen process and target set. This follows from the converse of the Début theorem (Fischer, 2013).
- Let B denote standard Brownian motion on the real line $\R$ starting at the origin. Then the hitting time τ_{A} satisfies the measurability requirements to be a stopping time for every Borel measurable set $A\subseteq\R.$
- For B as above, let τ_{r} (r > 0) denote the first exit time for the interval (−r, r), i.e. the first hit time for $(-\infty,-r]\cup [r, +\infty).$ Then the expected value and variance of τ_{r} satisfy

$$\begin{align}
\operatorname{E} \left[ \tau_r \right] &= r^2, \\
\operatorname{Var} \left[ \tau_r \right] &= \tfrac{2}{3} r^4.
\end{align}$$

- For B as above, the time of hitting a single point (different from the starting point 0) has the Lévy distribution.
- The narrow escape problem considers the time it takes for a confined particle, undergoing Brownian motion, to escape through a small opening.

== Début theorem ==
The hitting time of a set F is also known as the début of F. The Début theorem says that the hitting time of a measurable set F, for a progressively measurable process with respect to a right continuous and complete filtration, is a stopping time. Progressively measurable processes include, in particular, all right and left-continuous adapted processes. The proof that the début is measurable is rather involved and involves properties of analytic sets. The theorem requires the underlying probability space to be complete or, at least, universally complete.

The converse of the Début theorem states that every stopping time defined with respect to a filtration over a real-valued time index can be represented by a hitting time. In particular, for essentially any such stopping time there exists an adapted, non-increasing process with càdlàg (RCLL) paths that takes the values 0 and 1 only, such that the hitting time of the set {0} by this process is the considered stopping time. The proof is very simple.

== Markov chains ==
If a Markov chain is irreducible and positive-recurrent, then the stationary distribution is unique and given by

$$\begin{align}
\pi(i)=\frac{1}{\operatorname{E} \left[ \tau_i \right]}
\end{align}$$

where τ_{i} is the hitting time for a state i.

This can be viewed as a special case of Kac's lemma.

== See also ==
- Cover time, the time at which all states have been reached
- Stopping time
