= Coupon collector's problem =

Problem in probability theory

- Parameters: $n\in\mathbb N$ – number of faces on die
- Support: $k\in\mathbb N$ – rolls taken for all faces to appear
- PMF: $\frac{(n-1)^{\{k-1\}}}{n^{k-1}}$
- CDF: $\frac{n^{\{k\}}}{n^k}$
- Mean: $nH_n$
- Variance: $n^2H^{(2)}_n-nH_n$
- Skewness: $\frac{2n^3H^{(3)}_n-3n^2H^{(2)}_n+nH_n}{\left(n^2H^{(2)}_n-nH_n\right)^{3/2}}\ \underset n\sim\ 6^{3/2}2\frac{\zeta(3)}{\pi^3}$
- Excess kurtosis: $\frac{6n^4H^{(4)}_n-12n^3H^{(3)}_n+7n^2H^{(2)}_n-nH_n}{(n^2H^{(2)}_n-nH_n)^2}\sim\frac65$
- MGF: ${\frac n{e^t}\choose n}^{-1}$
- CF: ${\frac n{e^{it}}\choose n}^{-1}$
- PGF: $G(z) = {\frac nz\choose n}^{-1}$

Graph of number of coupons, n vs the expected number of trials (i.e., time) needed to collect them all E(T)

In probability theory, the coupon collector's problem refers to mathematical analysis of "collect all coupons and win" contests. It asks the following question: if each box of a given product (e.g., breakfast cereals) contains a coupon, and there are n different types of coupons, what is the probability that more than t boxes need to be bought to collect all n coupons? An alternative statement is: given n coupons, how many coupons do you expect you need to draw with replacement before having drawn each coupon at least once? The mathematical analysis of the problem reveals that the expected number of trials needed grows as $\Theta(n\log(n))$. (Note: Here and throughout this article, "log" refers to the natural logarithm rather than a logarithm to some other base. The use of Θ here invokes big O notation.) For example, when n = 50 it takes about 225 (Note: E(50) = 50(1 + 1/2 + 1/3 + ... + 1/50) = 224.9603, the expected number of trials to collect all 50 coupons. The approximation $n\log n+\gamma n+1/2$ for this expected number gives in this case $50\log 50+50\gamma+1/2 \approx 195.6011+28.8608+0.5\approx 224.9619$.) trials on average to collect all 50 coupons. Sometimes the problem is instead expressed in terms of an n-sided die.

The subpower is defined $a^{\{b\}}=a!\left\{{b\atop a}\right\}$, where $\left\{{b\atop a}\right\}$ is a Stirling number of the second kind.

== Solution ==
=== Calculating the expectation ===
Let time T be the number of draws needed to collect all n coupons, and let t_{i} be the time to collect the i-th coupon after i − 1 coupons have been collected. Then $T=t_1 + \cdots + t_n$. Think of T and t_{i} as random variables. Observe that the probability of collecting the i-th new coupon is $p_i = \frac{n - (i - 1)}{n} = \frac{n - i + 1}n$. Therefore, $t_i$ has geometric distribution with expectation $\frac{1}{p_i} = \frac n{n - i + 1}$. By the linearity of expectations we have:

$$\begin{align}
\operatorname{E}(T) & {}= \operatorname{E}(t_1 + t_2 + \cdots + t_n) \\
& {}= \operatorname{E}(t_1) + \operatorname{E}(t_2) + \cdots + \operatorname{E}(t_n) \\
& {}= \frac{1}{p_1} + \frac{1}{p_2} +  \cdots + \frac{1}{p_n} \\
& {}= \frac{n}{n} + \frac{n}{n-1} +  \cdots + \frac{n}{1} \\
& {}= n \cdot \left(\frac{1}{1} + \frac{1}{2} + \cdots + \frac{1}{n}\right) \\
& {}= n \cdot H_n.
\end{align}$$

Here H_{n} is the n-th harmonic number. Using the asymptotics of the harmonic numbers, we obtain:

$$\operatorname{E}(T)  = n \cdot H_n = n \log n + \gamma n + \frac{1}{2} + O(1/n),$$

where $\gamma \approx 0.5772156649$ is the Euler–Mascheroni constant.

Using the Markov inequality to bound the desired probability:

$$\operatorname{P}(T \geq cn H_n) \le \frac{1}{c}.$$

The above can be modified slightly to handle the case when we've already collected some of the coupons. Let k be the number of coupons already collected, then:

$$\begin{align}
\operatorname{E}(T_k) & {}= \operatorname{E}(t_{k+1} + t_{k+2} + \cdots + t_n) \\
& {}= n \cdot \left(\frac{1}{1} + \frac{1}{2} + \cdots + \frac{1}{n-k}\right) \\
& {}= n \cdot H_{n-k}
\end{align}$$

And when $k=0$ then we get the original result.

=== Calculating the variance ===
Using the independence of random variables t_{i}, we obtain:

$$\begin{align}
\operatorname{Var}(T)& {}= \operatorname{Var}(t_1 + \cdots + t_n) \\
& {} = \operatorname{Var}(t_1) + \operatorname{Var}(t_2) + \cdots + \operatorname{Var}(t_n) \\
& {} = \frac{1-p_1}{p_1^2} + \frac{1-p_2}{p_2^2} +  \cdots + \frac{1-p_n}{p_n^2} \\
& {} = \left(\frac{n^2}{n^2} + \frac{n^2}{(n-1)^2} +  \cdots + \frac{n^2}{1^2}\right) - \left(\frac{n}{n} + \frac{n}{n-1} +  \cdots + \frac{n}{1}\right) \\
& {} = n^2 \cdot \left(\frac{1}{1^2} + \frac{1}{2^2} + \cdots + \frac{1}{n^2} \right) - n \cdot \left(\frac{1}{1} + \frac{1}{2} + \cdots + \frac{1}{n} \right)\\
& {} < \frac{\pi^2}{6} n^2
\end{align}$$

since $\frac{\pi^2}6=\frac{1}{1^2}+\frac{1}{2^2}+\frac{1}{3^2}+\cdots$ (see Basel problem).

Bound the desired probability using the Chebyshev inequality:

$$\operatorname{P}\left(|T- n H_n| \geq cn\right) \le \frac{\pi^2}{6c^2}.$$

== Extensions and generalizations ==
- Pierre-Simon Laplace, but also Paul Erdős and Alfréd Rényi, proved the limit theorem for the distribution of T. This result is a further extension of previous bounds. A proof is found in.

$\operatorname{P}(T < n\log n + cn) \to e^{-e^{-c}}, \text{ as } n \to \infty.$ which is a Gumbel distribution. A simple proof by martingales is in .

.

- Donald J. Newman and Lawrence Shepp gave a generalization of the coupon collector's problem when m copies of each coupon need to be collected. Let T_{m} be the first time m copies of each coupon are collected. They showed that the expectation in this case satisfies:

$$\operatorname{E}(T_m) =  n \log n + (m-1) n \log\log n + O(n), \text{ as } n \to \infty.$$

Here m is fixed. When m = 1 we get the earlier formula for the expectation.

- Common generalization, also due to Erdős and Rényi:

$$\operatorname{P}\left(T_m < n\log n + (m-1) n \log\log n + cn\right) \to e^{-e^{-c}/(m-1)!}, \text{ as } n \to \infty.$$

- In the general case of a nonuniform probability distribution, according to Philippe Flajolet et al.

$$\operatorname{E}(T)=\int_0^\infty \left(1 - \prod_{i=1}^m \left(1-e^{-p_it}\right)\right)dt.$$

This is equal to

$$\operatorname{E}(T)=\sum_{q=0}^{m-1} (-1)^{m-1-q} \sum_{|J|=q} \frac{1}{1-P_J},$$

where m denotes the number of coupons to be collected and P_{J} denotes the probability of getting any coupon in the set of coupons J.

== See also ==
- Cover time – a generalization of the coupon collector's problem to Markov chains and random walks on graphs
- McDonald's Monopoly – an example of the coupon collector's problem that further increases the challenge by making some coupons of the set rarer
- Complete gacha – a game monetization practice now outlawed in Japan, that exploited the coupon collector's problem
- Watterson estimator
- Birthday problem
