= Feller-continuous process =

Continuous-time stochastic process

In mathematics, a Feller-continuous process is a continuous-time stochastic process for which the expected value of suitable statistics of the process at a given time in the future depend continuously on the initial condition of the process. The concept is named after Croatian-American mathematician William Feller.

== Definition ==
Let X : [0, +∞) × Ω → R^{n}, defined on a probability space (Ω, Σ, P), be a stochastic process. For a point x ∈ R^{n}, let P^{x} denote the law of X given initial value X_{0} = x, and let E^{x} denote expectation with respect to P^{x}. Then X is said to be a Feller-continuous process if, for any fixed t ≥ 0 and any bounded, continuous and Σ-measurable function g : R^{n} → R, E^{x}[g(X_{t})] depends continuously upon x.

== Examples ==
- Every process X whose paths are almost surely constant for all time is a Feller-continuous process, since then E^{x}[g(X_{t})] is simply g(x), which, by hypothesis, depends continuously upon x.
- Every Itô diffusion with Lipschitz-continuous drift and diffusion coefficients is a Feller-continuous process.

== See also ==
- Continuous stochastic process
