= Cover time =

Time to reach all states of a Markov chain

In mathematics, the cover time of a finite Markov chain is the number of steps taken by the chain, from a given starting state, until the first step at which all states have been reached. It is a random variable that depends on the Markov chain and the choice of the starting state. The cover time of a connected undirected graph is the cover time of the Markov chain that takes a random walk on the graph, at each step moving from one vertex to a uniformly-random neighbor of that vertex.

== Applications ==
Cover times of graphs have been extensively studied in theoretical computer science for applications involving the complexity of st-connectivity, algebraic graph theory and the study of expander graphs, and modeling Token Ring computer networking technology.

== In different classes of graphs ==
A classical problem in probability theory, the coupon collector's problem, can be interpreted as the result that the expected cover time of a complete graph $K_n$ is $n\ln n(1+o(1))$. For every other $n$-vertex graph, the expected cover time is at least as large as this formula. Any $n$-vertex regular expander graph also has expected cover time $\Theta(n\log n)$ from any starting vertex, and more generally the cover time of any regular graph is
$$O\left(\frac{n\log n}{1-\lambda_2}\right),$$
where $\lambda_2$ is the second-largest eigenvalue of the graph, normalized so that the largest eigenvalue is one. For arbitrary $n$-vertex graphs, from any starting vertex, the cover time is at most
$$\left(\frac{4}{27}+o(1)\right)n^3,$$
and there exist graphs whose expected cover time is this large. In planar graphs, the expected cover time is $\Omega(n\log^2 n)$ and $O(n^2)$.

== See also ==
- Hitting time, the number of steps until a set of states is first reached
