= Semi-elliptic operator =

Differential operator in mathematics

In mathematics — specifically, in the theory of partial differential equations — a semi-elliptic operator is a partial differential operator satisfying a positivity condition slightly weaker than that of being an elliptic operator. Every elliptic operator is also semi-elliptic, and semi-elliptic operators share many of the nice properties of elliptic operators: for example, much of the same existence and uniqueness theory is applicable, and semi-elliptic Dirichlet problems can be solved using the methods of stochastic analysis.

== Definition ==
A second-order partial differential operator P defined on an open subset Ω of n-dimensional Euclidean space R^{n}, acting on suitable functions f by

$$P f(x) = \sum_{i, j = 1}^{n} a_{ij} (x) \frac{\partial^{2} f}{\partial x_{i} \, \partial x_{j}}(x) + \sum_{i = 1}^{n} b_{i} (x) \frac{\partial f}{\partial x_{i}} (x) + c(x) f(x),$$

is said to be semi-elliptic if all the eigenvalues λ_{i}(x), 1 ≤ i ≤ n, of the matrix a(x) = (a_{ij}(x)) are non-negative. (By way of contrast, P is said to be elliptic if λ_{i}(x) > 0 for all x ∈ Ω and 1 ≤ i ≤ n, and uniformly elliptic if the eigenvalues are uniformly bounded away from zero, uniformly in i and x.) Equivalently, P is semi-elliptic if the matrix a(x) is positive semi-definite for each x ∈ Ω.
