= Natural filtration =

Type of filtration in the theory of stochastic processes

In the theory of stochastic processes in mathematics and statistics, the generated filtration or natural filtration associated to a stochastic process is a filtration associated to the process which records its "past behaviour" at each time. It is in a sense the simplest filtration available for studying the given process: all information concerning the process, and only that information, is available in the natural filtration.

== Formal definition ==
Let

- $(\Omega, \mathcal A, P)$ be a probability space.
- $(I, \le)$ be a totally ordered index set. In many examples, the index set $I$ is the natural numbers $\N$ (possibly including 0) or an interval $[0, T]$ or $[0, +\infty).$
- $(S, \Sigma)$ be a measurable space. Often, the state space $S$ is often the real line $\R$ or Euclidean space $\R^n.$
- $X:I\times\Omega\to S$ be a stochastic process.

Then the natural filtration of $\mathcal{A}$ with respect to $X$ is defined to be the filtration $\mathbb{F}^X=\mathcal{F}^X_\bullet=(\mathcal{F}^X_i)_{i\in I}$ given by

$$\mathcal{F}^X_i = \sigma \left\{ \left. X_{j}^{-1} (B) \right| j \in I, j \leq i, B \in \Sigma \right\},$$

i.e., the smallest σ-algebra on $\Omega$ that contains all pre-images of $\Sigma$-measurable subsets of $S$ for "times" $j$ up to $i$.

Any stochastic process $X$ is an adapted process with respect to its natural filtration.

== Examples ==
Two examples are given below, the Bernoulli process and the Wiener process. The simpler example, the Bernoullii process, is treated somewhat awkwardly and verbosely, belabored, but using a notation that allows more direct contact with the Wiener process.

=== Bernoulli process ===
The Bernoulli process is the process $X$ of coin-flips. The sample space is $\Omega=\{0,1\}^\N=2^\N,$ the set of all infinitely-long sequences of binary strings. A single point $\omega\in\Omega$ then specifies a single, specific infinitely long sequence. The index set $I=\N$ is the natural numbers. The state space is the set of symbols $S=\{H,T\}$ indicating heads or tails. Fixing $\omega$ to a specific sequence, $X(i,\omega)$ then indicates the $i$'th outcome of the coin-flip, heads or tails. The conventional notation for this process is $X_i=X(i,-),$ indicating that all possibilities should be considered at time $i.$

The sigma algebra on the state space contains four elements: $\Sigma=\{\varnothing,\{H\},\{T\},S\}.$ The set $X_{j}^{-1}(B)$ for some $B\in\Sigma$ is then a cylinder set, consisting of all strings having an element of $B$ at location $j:$

$$X_{j}^{-1}(B) = \{\omega\in\Omega : X(j,\omega)=b \text{ and } b\in B\}$$

The filtration is then the sigma algebra generated by these cylinder sets; it is exactly as above:

$$\mathcal{F}_i = \sigma \left\{ X_{j}^{-1} (B) : j \leq i, B \in \Sigma \right\},$$

The sub-sigma-algebra $\mathcal{F}_i$ can be understood as the sigma algebra for which the first $i$ symbols of the process have been fixed, and all the remaining symbols are left indeterminate.

This can also be looked at from a "sideways" direction. The set

$$C(i,\omega)=\{\alpha\in\Omega: X(j,\alpha)=X(j,\omega) \text{ for } j\le i\}$$

is a cylinder set, for which all points $\alpha\in C(i,\omega)$ match exactly $X(-,\omega)$ for the first $i$ coin-flips. Clearly, one has that $C(k,\omega)\subset C(i,\omega)$ whenever $k>i.$ That is, as more and more of the initial sequence is fixed, the corresponding cylinder sets become finer.

Let $A\in\mathcal{A}$ be one of the sets in the sigma algebra $\mathcal{A}.$ Cylinder sets can be defined in a corresponding manner:

$$C(i,A)=\{\alpha\in\Omega: X(j,\alpha)=X(j,\omega) \text{ for } j\le i \text{ and } \omega\in A\}$$

Again, one has that $C(k,A)\subset C(i,A)$ whenever $k>i.$

The filtration can be understood to be

$$\mathcal{F}_i = \{C(i,A) | A\in \mathcal{A} \}$$

consisting of all sets for which the first $i$ outcomes have been fixed. As time progresses, the filtrations become finer, so that $\mathcal{F}_i \subset \mathcal{F}_k$ for $i<k.$

=== Wiener process ===
The Wiener process $X$ can be taken to be set in the classical Wiener space $\Omega = C_0([0,T])$ consisting of all continuous functions on the interval $I=[0,T].$ The state space $S$ can be taken to be Euclidean space: $S=\R^n$ and $\Sigma=\mathcal{B}(\R^n)$ the standard Borel algebra on $\R^n.$ The Wiener process is then $X:I\times\Omega\to S.$

The interpretation is that fixing a single point $\omega\in\Omega$ fixes a single continuous path $X(\cdot,\omega):I\to S.$ Unlike the Bernoulli process, however, it is not possible to construct the filtration out of the components

$$X_t^{-1}(B) = \{\omega\in\Omega : X(t,\omega)=x \text{ and } x\in B\}$$

for some $B\in\mathcal{B}(\R^n).$ The primary issue is that $I$ is uncountable, and so one cannot perform a naive union of such sets, while also preserving continuity. However, the approach of fixing the initial portion of the path does follow through. By analogy, define

$$C(t,\omega)=\{\alpha\in\Omega: X(s,\alpha)=X(s,\omega) \text{ for } s\le t\}$$

This consists of all continuous functions, that is, elements of $\Omega$ for which the initial segment $s\le t$ exactly matches a selected sample function $X(\cdot,\omega).$ As before, one has that $C(u,\omega)\subset C(t,\omega)$ whenever $t<u,$ that is, the set becomes strictly finer as time increases.

Presuming that one has defined a sigma algebra $\mathcal{A}$ on the (classical) Wiener space, then for a given $A\in\mathcal{A},$ the corresponding cylinder can be defined as

$$C(t,A)=\{\alpha\in\Omega: X(s,\alpha)=X(s,\omega) \text{ for } s\le t \text{ and } \omega\in A\}$$

which also becomes finer for increasing time: $C(u,A)\subset C(t,A)$ whenever $t<u.$

The desired filtration is then

$$\mathcal{F}_t = \{C(t,A) | A\in \mathcal{A} \}.$$

As before, it becomes strictly finer with increasing time: $\mathcal{F}_t \subset \mathcal{F}_u$ whenever $t<u.$

== See also ==
- Filtration (mathematics)
