= Feller process =

Stochastic process

In probability theory relating to stochastic processes, a Feller process is a particular kind of Markov process.

== Definitions ==
Let $X$ be a locally compact Hausdorff space with a countable base. Let $C_0(X)$ denote the space of all real-valued continuous functions on $X$ that vanish at infinity, equipped with the sup-norm $\|f\|$. From analysis, we know that $C_0(X)$ with the sup norm is a Banach space.

A Feller semigroup on $C_0(X)$ is a contraction C_{0}-semigroup of positive operators on $C_0(X)$. Concretely, it is a collection $(T_t)_{t \ge 0}$ of linear maps from $C_0(X)$ to itself with the following properties:

- $T_t f \ge 0$ for all $t \ge 0$ and $f \in C_0(X)$ where $f \ge 0$, i.e., each $T_t$ is a positive operator;
- $\|T_t f\| \le \|f\|$ for all $t \ge 0$ and $f \in C_0(X)$, i.e., it is a contraction (in the weak sense);
- $T_0 = \operatorname{Id}$ and $T_{t+s} = T_t \circ T_s$ for all $s,t \ge 0$, i.e., it is a semigroup;
- $\lim_{t \to 0} \|T_t f - f\| = 0$ for every $f \in C_0(X)$. Using the semigroup property, this is equivalent to the map $T_t f$ from $t \in [0,\infty)$ to $C_0(X)$ being right continuous for every $f$.

Warning: This terminology is not uniform across the literature. In particular, the assumption that $T_t$ maps $C_0(X)$ into itself is replaced by some authors by the condition that it maps $C_b(X)$, the space of bounded continuous functions, into itself. The reason for this is twofold: first, it allows including processes that enter "from infinity" in finite time. Second, it is more suitable to the treatment of spaces that are not locally compact and for which the notion of "vanishing at infinity" makes no sense.

A Feller transition function is a probability transition function associated with a Feller semigroup.

A Feller process is a Markov process with a Feller transition function.

== Generator ==
Feller processes (or transition semigroups) can be described by their infinitesimal generator. A function $f$ in $C_0(X)$ is said to be in the domain of the generator if the uniform limit

$$Af = \lim_{t\rightarrow 0} \frac{T_tf - f}{t},$$

exists. The operator $A$ is the generator of $(T_t)_{t \ge 0}$, and the space of functions on which it is defined is written as $D(A)$.

A characterization of operators that can occur as the infinitesimal generator of Feller processes is given by the Hille–Yosida theorem. This uses the resolvent of the Feller semigroup, defined below.

== Resolvent ==
The resolvent of a Feller process (or semigroup) is a collection of maps $(R_\lambda)_{\lambda > 0}$ from $C_0(X)$ to itself defined by

$$R_\lambda f = \int_0^\infty e^{-\lambda t}T_t f\,dt.$$

It can be shown that it satisfies the identity

$$R_\lambda R_\mu = R_\mu R_\lambda = (R_\mu-R_\lambda)/(\lambda-\mu).$$

Furthermore, for any fixed $\lambda > 0$, the image of $R_\lambda$ is equal to the domain $D(A)$ of the generator $A$, and

$$\begin{align}
& R_\lambda = (\lambda - A)^{-1}, \\
& A = \lambda - R_\lambda^{-1}.
\end{align}$$

== Examples ==
- Brownian motion and the Poisson process are examples of Feller processes (with Feller semigroups given by $T_{t}f := \mathbb{E}[f(X_{t})]$). More generally, every Lévy process is a Feller process.
- Bessel processes are Feller processes.
- Solutions to stochastic differential equations with Lipschitz continuous coefficients are Feller processes.
- Every adapted right continuous Feller process on a filtered probability space $(\Omega, \mathcal{F}, (\mathcal{F}_t)_{t\geq 0})$ satisfies the strong Markov property with respect to the filtration $(\mathcal{F}_{t^+})_{t\geq 0}$, i.e., for each $(\mathcal{F}_{t^+})_{t\geq 0}$-stopping time $\tau$, conditioned on the event $\{\tau < \infty\}$, we have that for each $t\ge 0$, $X_{\tau + t}$ is independent of $\mathcal{F}_{\tau^+}$ given $X_\tau$.

== See also ==
- Markov process
- Markov chain
- Hunt process
- Infinitesimal generator (stochastic processes)
