= Index set =

Mathematical term

In mathematics, an index set is a set whose members label (or index) members of another set. For instance, if the elements of a set A may be indexed or labeled by means of the elements of a set J, then J is an index set. The indexing consists of a surjective function from J onto A, and the indexed collection is typically called an indexed family, often written as {A_{j}}_{j∈J}.

== Examples ==
- An enumeration of a set S gives an index set $J \sub \N$, where f : J → S is the particular enumeration of S.
- Any countably infinite set can be (injectively) indexed by the set of natural numbers $\N$.
- For $r \in \R$, the indicator function on r is the function $\mathbf{1}_r\colon \R \to \{0,1\}$ given by
  $$\mathbf{1}_r (x) := \begin{cases} 0, & \mbox{if } x \ne r \\ 1, & \mbox{if } x = r. \end{cases}$$

The set of all such indicator functions, $\{ \mathbf{1}_r \}_{r\in\R}$, is an uncountable set indexed by $\mathbb{R}$.

== Other uses ==
In computational complexity theory and cryptography, an index set is a set for which there exists an algorithm I that can sample the set efficiently; e.g., on input 1^{n}, I can efficiently select a poly(n)-bit long element from the set.

== See also ==
- Friendly-index set
