= Infinitesimal generator (stochastic processes) =

Stochastic differential equation

In mathematics — specifically, in stochastic analysis — the infinitesimal generator of a Feller process (i.e. a continuous-time Markov process satisfying certain regularity conditions) is a linear operator that encodes a great deal of information about the process. Most notably for Lévy processes on $\mathbb{R}^d$, the generator is a Fourier multiplier operator, but in general a Feller-process generator need not be a Fourier multiplier.

The generator is used in evolution equations such as the Kolmogorov backward equation, which describes the evolution of statistics of the process; its L^{2} Hermitian adjoint is used in evolution equations such as the Fokker–Planck equation, also known as Kolmogorov forward equation, which describes the evolution of the probability density functions of the process.

The Kolmogorov forward equation in the notation is just $\partial_t \rho = \mathcal A^* \rho$, where $\rho$ is the probability density function, and $\mathcal A^*$ is the adjoint of the infinitesimal generator of the underlying stochastic process. The Klein–Kramers equation is a special case of that.

== Definition ==
=== General case ===
For a Feller process $(X_t)_{t \geq 0}$ with Feller semigroup $T=(T_t)_{t\geq 0}$ and state space $E$ the generator $(A,D(A))$ is defined as

$$\begin{align}
D(A) & = \left\{f\in C_0(E): \lim_{t\downarrow 0} \frac{T_t f-f}{t} \text{ exists as uniform limit}\right\},\\
A f &= \lim_{t \downarrow 0} \frac{T_t f-f}{t} , ~~ \text{ for any } f\in D(A).\\
\end{align}$$

Here $C_{0}(E)$ denotes the Banach space of continuous functions on $E$ vanishing at infinity, equipped with the supremum norm, and $T_t f(x) = \mathbb{E}^x f(X_t)=\mathbb{E}(f(X_t)|X_0=x)$. In general, it is not easy to describe the domain of the Feller generator. However, the Feller generator is always closed and densely defined. If $X$ is $\mathbb{R}^d$-valued and $D(A)$ contains the test functions (compactly supported smooth functions) then
$$A f(x) = - c(x) f(x) + l (x) \cdot \nabla f(x) + \frac{1}{2} \text{div} Q(x) \nabla f(x) + \int_{\mathbb{R}^d \setminus{\{0\}}} \left( f(x+y)-f(x)-\nabla f(x) \cdot y \chi(|y|) \right) N(x,dy),$$
where $c(x) \geq 0$, and $(l(x), Q(x),N(x,\cdot))$ is a Lévy triplet for fixed $x \in \mathbb{R}^d$.

=== Lévy processes ===
The generator of Lévy semigroup is of the form
$$A f(x)= l \cdot \nabla f(x) + \frac{1}{2} \text{div} Q \nabla f(x) + \int_{\mathbb{R}^d \setminus{\{0\}}} \left( f(x+y)-f(x)-\nabla f(x) \cdot y \,\chi(|y|) \right) \nu(dy)$$
where $l \in \mathbb{R}^d, Q\in \mathbb{R}^{d\times d}$ is positive semidefinite and $\nu$ is a Lévy measure satisfying
$$\int_{\mathbb{R}^d\setminus \{0\}} \min(|y|^2,1) \nu(dy) < \infty$$
and $0 \leq 1-\chi(s) \leq \kappa \min(s,1)$for some $\kappa >0$ with $s \chi(s)$ is bounded. If we define
$$\psi(\xi)=\psi(0)-i l \cdot \xi + \frac{1}{2} \xi \cdot Q \xi + \int_{\mathbb{R}^d \setminus \{0\}} (1-e^{i y \cdot \xi}+i\xi \cdot y \,\chi(|y|)) \nu(dy )$$
for $\psi(0) \geq 0$ then the generator can be written as
$$A f (x) = - \int e^{i x \cdot \xi} \psi (\xi) \hat{f}(\xi) d \xi$$
where $\hat{f}$ denotes the Fourier transform. So the generator of a Lévy process (or semigroup) is a Fourier multiplier operator with symbol $-\psi$.

=== Stochastic differential equations driven by Lévy processes ===
Let $L$ be a Lévy process with symbol $\psi$ (see above). Let $\Phi$ be locally Lipschitz and bounded. The solution of the SDE $d X_t = \Phi(X_{t-}) d L_t$ exists for each deterministic initial condition $x \in \mathbb{R}^d$ and yields a Feller process with symbol $q(x,\xi)=\psi(\Phi^\top(x)\xi).$

Note that in general, the solution of an SDE driven by a Feller process which is not Lévy might fail to be Feller or even Markovian.

As a simple example consider $d X_t = l(X_t) dt+ \sigma(X_t) dW_t$ with a Brownian motion driving noise. If we assume $l,\sigma$ are Lipschitz and of linear growth, then for each deterministic initial condition there exists a unique solution, which is Feller with symbol
$$q(x,\xi)=- i l(x)\cdot \xi + \frac{1}{2} \xi Q(x)\xi.$$

== Mean first passage time ==
The mean first passage time $T_1$ satisfies $\mathcal A T_1 = -1$. This can be used to calculate, for example, the time it takes for a Brownian motion particle in a box to hit the boundary of the box, or the time it takes for a Brownian motion particle in a potential well to escape the well. Under certain assumptions, the escape time satisfies the Arrhenius equation.

== Generators of some common processes ==
For finite-state continuous time Markov chains the generator may be expressed as a transition rate matrix.

The general n-dimensional diffusion process $dX_t = \mu(X_t, t) \,dt + \sigma(X_t, t) \,dW_t$ has generator
$$\mathcal{A}f =  (\nabla f)^T \mu + tr( (\nabla^2 f) D)$$
where $D = \frac 12 \sigma\sigma^T$ is the diffusion matrix, $\nabla^2 f$ is the Hessian of the function $f$, and $tr$ is the matrix trace. Its adjoint operator is
$$\mathcal{A}^*f =  -\sum_i \partial_i (f \mu_i) + \sum_{ij} \partial_{ij} (fD_{ij})$$
The following are commonly used special cases for the general n-dimensional diffusion process.

- Standard Brownian motion on $\mathbb{R}^{n}$, which satisfies the stochastic differential equation $dX_{t} = dB_{t}$, has generator ${1\over{2}}\Delta$, where $\Delta$ denotes the Laplace operator.
- The two-dimensional process $Y$ satisfying:
  $$\mathrm{d} Y_{t} = { \mathrm{d} t \choose \mathrm{d} B_{t} }$$
  where $B$ is a one-dimensional Brownian motion, can be thought of as the graph of that Brownian motion, and has generator:
  $$\mathcal{A}f(t, x) = \frac{\partial f}{\partial t} (t, x) + \frac1{2} \frac{\partial^{2} f}{\partial x^{2}} (t, x)$$
- The Ornstein–Uhlenbeck process on $\mathbb{R}$, which satisfies the stochastic differential equation $dX_{t} = \theta(\mu-X_{t})dt + \sigma dB_{t}$, has generator:
  $$\mathcal{A} f(x) = \theta(\mu - x) f'(x) + \frac{\sigma^{2}}{2} f''(x)$$
- Similarly, the graph of the Ornstein–Uhlenbeck process has generator:
  $$\mathcal{A} f(t, x) = \frac{\partial f}{\partial t} (t, x) + \theta(\mu - x) \frac{\partial f}{\partial x} (t, x) + \frac{\sigma^{2}}{2} \frac{\partial^{2} f}{\partial x^{2}} (t, x)$$
- A geometric Brownian motion on $\mathbb{R}$, which satisfies the stochastic differential equation $dX_{t} = rX_{t}dt + \alpha X_{t}dB_{t}$, has generator:
  $$\mathcal{A} f(x) = r x f'(x) + \frac1{2} \alpha^{2} x^{2} f''(x)$$

== See also ==
- Dynkin's formula
