= Filtration (probability theory) =

Model of information available at a given point of a random process

In the theory of stochastic processes, a subdiscipline of probability theory, filtrations are totally ordered collections of subsets that are used to model the information that is available at a given point and therefore play an important role in the formalization of random (stochastic) processes.

== Definition ==
Let $(\Omega, \mathcal A, P)$ be a probability space and let $I$ be an index set with a total order $\leq$ (often $\N$, $\R^+$, or a subset of $\mathbb R^+$).

For every $i \in I$ let $\mathcal F_i$ be a sub-σ-algebra of $\mathcal A$. Then

$$\mathbb F:= (\mathcal F_i)_{i \in I}$$

is called a filtration, if $\mathcal F_k \subseteq \mathcal F_\ell$ for all $k \leq \ell$. So filtrations are families of σ-algebras that are ordered non-decreasingly. If $\mathbb F$ is a filtration, then $(\Omega, \mathcal A, \mathbb F, P)$ is called a filtered probability space.

== Example ==
Let $(X_n)_{n \in \N}$ be a stochastic process on the probability space $(\Omega, \mathcal A, P)$. Let $\sigma(X_k \mid k \leq n)$ denote the σ-algebra generated by the random variables $X_1, X_2, \dots, X_n$. Then

$$\mathcal F_n:=\sigma(X_k \mid k \leq n)$$

is a σ-algebra and $\mathbb F= (\mathcal F_n)_{n \in \N}$ is a filtration.

$\mathbb F$ really is a filtration, since by definition all $\mathcal F_n$ are σ-algebras and

$$\sigma(X_k \mid k \leq n) \subseteq \sigma(X_k \mid k \leq n+1).$$

This is known as the natural filtration of $\mathcal A$ with respect to $(X_n)_{n \in \N}$.

== Types of filtrations ==
=== Right-continuous filtration ===
If $\mathbb F= (\mathcal F_i)_{i \in I}$ is a filtration, then the corresponding right-continuous filtration is defined as

$$\mathbb F^+:= (\mathcal F_i^+)_{i \in I},$$

with

$$\mathcal F_i^+:= \bigcap_{z > i} \mathcal F_z.$$

The filtration $\mathbb F$ itself is called right-continuous if $\mathbb F^+ = \mathbb F$.

=== Complete filtration ===
Let $(\Omega, \mathcal F, P)$ be a probability space, and let

$$\mathcal N_P:= \{A \subseteq \Omega \mid A \subseteq B \text{ for some } B \in  \mathcal F \text{ with } P(B)=0 \}$$

be the set of all sets that are contained within a $P$-null set.

A filtration $\mathbb F= (\mathcal F_i)_{i \in I}$ is called a complete filtration, if every $\mathcal F_i$ contains $\mathcal N_P$. This implies $(\Omega, \mathcal F_i, P)$ is a complete measure space for every $i \in I.$ (The converse is not necessarily true.)

=== Augmented filtration ===
A filtration is called an augmented filtration if it is complete and right continuous. For every filtration $\mathbb F$ there exists a smallest augmented filtration $\tilde {\mathbb F}$ refining $\mathbb F$.

If a filtration is an augmented filtration, it is said to satisfy the usual hypotheses or the usual conditions.

== See also ==
- Natural filtration
- Filtration (mathematics)
- Filter (mathematics)
