= David Holcman =

Applied mathematician and computational biologist

- Known for: Computational neurobiology, applied mathematics, and biophysics
- Awards: Sloan-Keck fellowship award & Marie-Curie award
- Scientific career
- Workplaces: École Normale Supérieure

David Holcman is a French computational neurobiologist, applied mathematician, and biophysicist at the École Normale Supérieure.

== Works ==
Holcman's research interests include computational neuroscience, data modeling, computational methods, mathematical biology, stochastic processes, stochastic simulations, theory of cellular microworld, neuronal networks, computational biology and neuroscience, asymptotic approaches in partial differential equations, predictive medicine, electroencephalography (EEG) analysis, and modeling organelles in cells. His contributions also extend to methods for analyzing single particle trajectories, calcium dynamics in dendritic spines, AI-based statistical methods, polymer models, and simulations for chromatin and nucleus organization. His recent work has focused on predicting brain state transitions during general anesthesia by analyzing real-time multidimensional dynamics, including time-frequency patterns and signal suppressions.

His research concerns various fields:

- Narrow escape problem: to estimate escape times of stochastic particles from confined domains, Holcman, Schuss and Singer developed asymptotic methods based on the Laplace equation. The theory has been validated by physical experiments and is used in cell biology to estimate time scales of molecular activation.
- Redundancy principle in biology: He developed extreme statistics in the context of Narrow escape to demonstrate how biological systems leverage redundancy to maintain cell function despite stochastic fluctuations.
- Neurobiological and Biophysical Modeling: His research encompasses the modeling of receptors, ions, and molecular trafficking in neurobiology, including studies of diffusion and electrodiffusion in nanodomains such as dendritic spines, as well as the analysis and simulations of neuronal networks dynamics (e.g., Up and Down states in electrophysiology).
- Modeling developmental biology and neuronal navigation: through the modeling of morphogen gradients, intracellular trafficking, and axon guidance. In collaboration with Alain Prochiantz, he developed quantitative models of morphogen signaling, challenging classical views of transcription factor action. Holcman introduced novel mathematical tools to study how cells interpret spatial cues during development. A landmark contribution is the concept of triangulation sensing, which explains how cells localize signal sources using spatially distributed receptors. Holcman's models combine stochastic processes, diffusion theory, and complex geometry.
- Data science of single particle trajectories, Multiscale Methods and Polymer Physics: He developed multiscale methods, simulation techniques for analyzing extensive molecular super-resolution trajectory data and polymer physics models to study cell nucleus organization.
- Reconstruction Algorithms of astrocyte networks within neural tissue. He introduced several software programs such as AstroNet, a data-driven algorithm that utilizes two-photon calcium imaging to map temporal correlations in astrocyte activation. This method revealed distinct connectivity patterns in the hippocampus and motor cortex, providing new insights into the functional organization of astrocytic networks in the brain. In general his computational models of astrocyte signaling offer a deeper understanding of how these glial cells maintain neural homeostasis and modulate synaptic function.
- EEG Analysis and real-time Anesthesia Monitoring: The development of adaptive algorithms for analyzing real-time EEG data during general anesthesia allowed for dynamic prediction of brain state transitions. By integrating time-frequency analysis with statistical methods, his work has significantly improved the precision of EEG monitoring, leading to optimized decision in anesthesia dosing and enhanced patient safety.
- AI and Spatial Statistics Applications in cell biology: applying AI-based techniques to extract and interpret complex spatial patterns from neurophysiological data in order to better understand brain connectivity and the neural effects of anesthetic agents.

These computational approaches have led to several experimentally verified predictions in the life sciences, including the nanocolumn organization of synapses, astrocytic protrusions penetrating neuronal synapses, and insights into the organization of the endoplasmic reticulum and topologically associated domains, where multiple boundary types have been found.

== Publications ==
Holcman has published over 250 journal articles and holds two patents. He has also co-authored or edited several books.

He is the co-author of the books:

- David Holcman and Zeev Schuss, Stochastic Narrow Escape in Molecular and Cellular Biology: Analysis and Applications, 2015-09-08, ISBN 978-1-4939-3102-6
- David Holcman (editor), Stochastic Processes, Multiscale Modeling, and Numerical Methods for Computational Cellular Biology, 2017-10-04, ISBN 978-3-319-62626-0
- David Holcman and Zeev Schuss, Asymptotics of Elliptic and Parabolic PDEs: and their Applications in Statistical Physics, Computational Neuroscience, and Biophysics, 2018-05-25 ISBN 978-3-319-76894-6
- IVAN KUPKA LEGACY: A Tour Through Controlled Dynamics. By Bernard Bonnard, Monique Chyba, David Holcman and Emmanuel Trélat (Eds.) ISBN 1-60133-026-X

== Press coverage ==
To celebrate the first winners of the European Research Council (ERC) in 2007, an international meeting was organized in Paris, so that they could discuss their vision and research plan for the future. In 2011, mathematical modeling was at a turning point as it was becoming predictive for molecular and cellular processes: this moment was summarized in an interview with the CNRS journal. The notion of time for living organisms can be defined as the first time the shortest telomere reaches a minimal threshold value: it is a random variable, controlled by the extreme statistics associated with telomere dynamics. "How cells are counting time?": this work was popularized in a viewpoint article in 2013: The Life and Death of Cells. The discovery reported in 2014, that astrocytes could invade the synaptic cleft under some specific conditions was recognized as a key result for controlling synaptic function. The work on computing the time for spermatozoa to reach an egg in the uterus received the Pineapple Science Award (Math Prize), the Chinese equivalent of the Ig Nobel Prize in 2018.

The novel nanoscale molecular organization underlying calcium dynamics in synapses, revealed by combining multidisciplinary approaches (live cell imaging, modeling, simulation, super-resolution) and published in 2021 brought novel concepts to the basis of memory and memory architecture. From 2019 to 2022, the work on Electro-encephalogram (EEG) analysis led to several applications to better monitor and control anesthesia doses, popularized in "Pour La science". In 2022, the adaptative algorithm to predict the sensitivity to general anesthesia developed by Holcman's group gained interest from the national French newspaper Le Monde. In 2025, the Proof-of-concept grant from ERC has been attributed to 5 French researchers hosted by the CNRS.

== Awards ==
Holcman has received several awards, including a Sloan-Keck fellowship award (2002), a Marie-Curie Award (2013), and a Simons Fellowship. He is also a recipient of 2 ERCs: an ERC Starting Grant in mathematics (2007) and an ERC-Advanced Grant in computational biology (2019) and a grant Proofs of Concept 2024 and a 2025 fellow of the Academia Europaea.
