= Asaf Hajiyev =

Azerbaijani mathematician (born 1951)

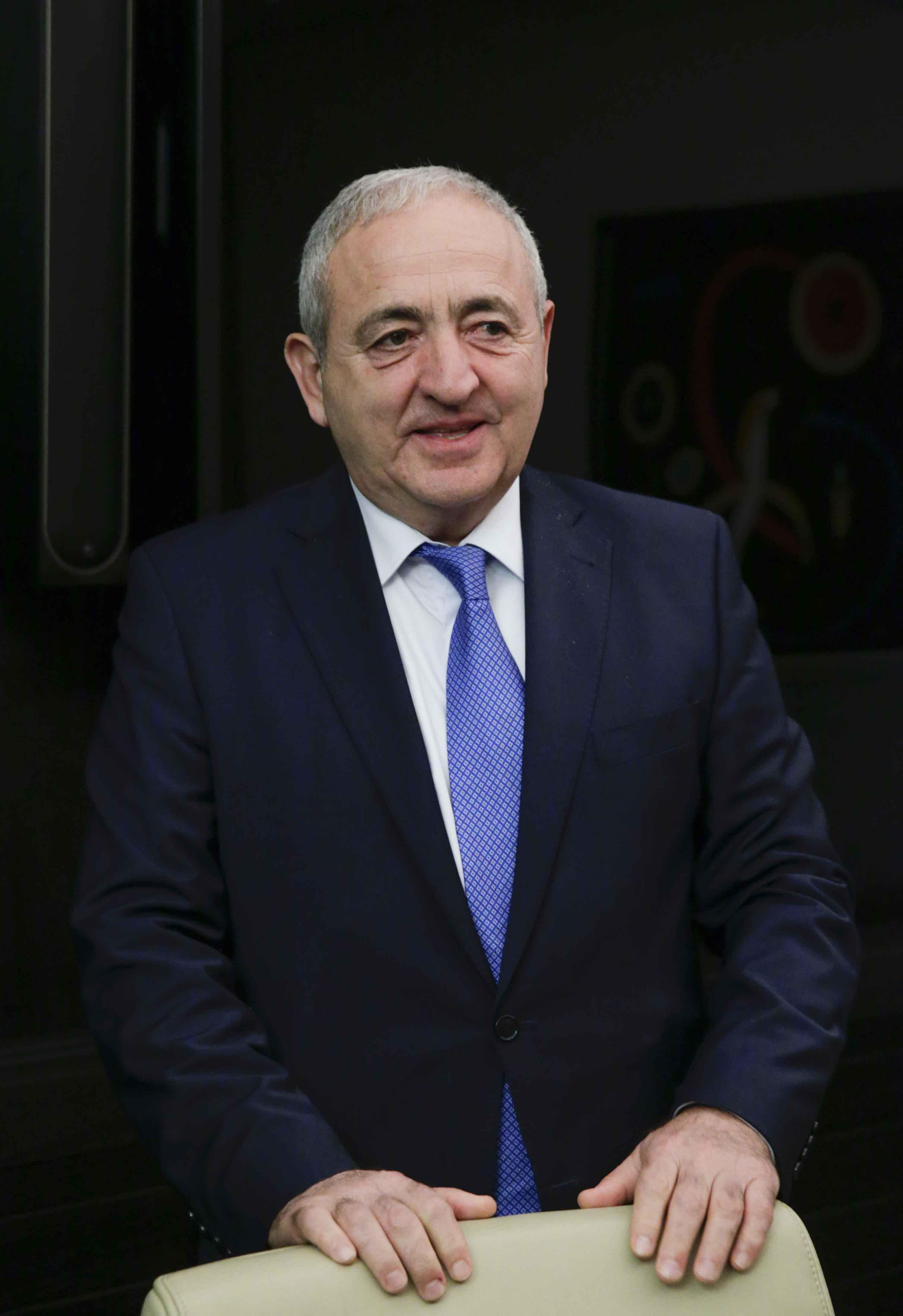
2015

Asaf Hajiyev is the Secretary-General of the Parliamentary Assembly of the Black Sea Economic Cooperation, Former Member of National Assembly (Milli Mejlis) of the Republic of Azerbaijan, Doctor of Physical and Mathematical Sciences, Professor, Academician, Chair of Probability Theory and Mathematical Statistics in BSU.

== Background ==
Asaf Hajiyev was born on 29 May 1951 in Ganja (Azerbaijan). In 1973, he graduated from the Mechanics and Mathematics Faculty of Lomonosov Moscow State University (MSU), in1979 got a Ph.D. in mathematics in MSU, and in 1992 Doctor of Sciences degree in N.Bauman Moscow State Technical University, professor. In 2001 he was elected correspondent member and in 2014 full member (academician) of the Azerbaijan National Academy of Sciences. His scientific interests are the theory of probability and mathematical statistics, queuing theory, regression models, and stochastic simulation. He is the author of 3 books and more than 150 scientific articles, published in world-leading scientific journals and the editor of 10 books, published in Springer. He is author of the Encyclopedia of Theory of Probability and Mathematical Statistics in Azerbaijanian language and Azerbaijan-Turkish-English-Russian Terminology Vocabulary of Theory of Probability and Mathematical Statistics. Under his leadership, the optimal placement of the letters of Azerbaijanian language on a computer keyboard has been created and was placed, on Windows 9.0.

In 1980 A. Hajiyev was awarded the Lenin Komsomol Prize in Science and Engineering. He was elected to the International Statistical Institute is a member of the Bernoulli Society of Mathematical Statistics and Probability Theory. A. Hajiyev is Fellow of The World Academy of Sciences (TWAS, Italy), Honorary Member of the Mongolian National Academy of Sciences, Foreign Member of the Academy of Sciences of the Republic of Moldova, Honorary Professor, and Founding Member of International Advisory Board of Sichuan University (China). 2001-2015 he was chair of the department of theory of probability and mathematical statistics at Baku State University. Under his leadership, 4 Doctor of Sciences and 8 Ph.D. thesis have been defended. Since 1998 he is Head of the department in the Institute of Control Systems, Azerbaijan National Academy of Sciences. He has invited professors of University of California, Berkeley, George Washington University, University of Southern California (USC), Lincoln University (California), Lincoln University (Missouri), Lincoln University (Pennsylvania), Royal Institute of Technology, Chalmers University, Umea University (Sweden), Bogazici University, METU (Turkey), LMU Munich, University of Hagen, Free University of Berlin (Germany), Lisbon University,(Portugal) and others. 2005-2010 he was a senior associate of the Abdus Salam International Centre for Theoretical Physics.

A. Hajiyev is a member of the board the several scientific journals: Applied and Computational Mathematics, Management Science and Engineering Management, Experimental Biology and Agriculture Sciences. In 2006-2015 he was a member of Milli Mejlis (Parliament of the Republic of Azerbaijan) from Ganja. In 2006-2008 and 2011-2013 he was elected vice-president of the Parliamentary Assembly of the Black Sea Cooperation (PABSEC) and in 2015 the Secretary-General of PABSEC until 2025. Since 2008 he is a member of the New Azerbaijan Party (NAP) and in 2013 was elected a member of the Political Council of NAP. He is married and has 3 children.

== Curriculum Vitae ==
Born: 29 May 1951

Political Experience: 2015 – Current Secretary-General of the PABSEC, 1996 – 2015 Member of Azerbaijani Parliament (Milli Majlis), 2002 – 2015 Head of Delegation of the Milli Majlis to the PABSEC, 2006 -2008; 2011 - 2013 vice-president of the PABSEC, 2013 – 2015 Head of International Relations Department of the New Azerbaijan Party, Since 2012 Elected member of the Political Council of the New Azerbaijan Party,

Education and Scientific Degrees: 2014 Academician - (full member of Azerbaijan National Academy of Sciences), Since 2001 Professor, 1992 Doctor of Science, Bauman Moscow State Technical University, 1979 PhD in mathematics, Lomonosov Moscow State University, 1973 Lomonosov Moscow State University - BA in Mathematics

Honorary Titles: Fellow of The World Academy of Sciences (TWAS, Italy), Honorary Academician of Moldova Academy of Sciences, Honorary Member of Mongolian National Academy of Sciences, Honorary Professor of Sichuan University in Chengdu, Lenin Komsomol Prize Winner in Science and Engineering,

Visiting Professor: USA - University of California, Berkeley, University of Southern California, Lincoln University, George Washington University, Germany - Humboldt University of Berlin, LMU Munich, Free University of Berlin, University of Hagen, Sweden - Royal Institute of Technology, Stockholm University, Chalmers University, Umea University, China - Sichuan University in Chengdu, Hong-Kong City University, Portugal - Lisbon University, Turkey - Bogazici University, Middle East Technical University, Anatolian University, Singapore - National University of Singapore,

Foreign Languages: English, Russian, Turkish - fluently

== Basic scientific achievements ==
1. The function of delays of service management requirements is entered for queuing Systems and in this class Control Theory is created for queuing Systems. A large class of queuing systems can be managed is revealed, the average waiting time minimizing requirements for optimal control function found. 2. Letters of different alphabets on computer keyboards The Statistical approach has been proposed for optimal placement. This approach was proposed in accordance with the optimal placement of the letters on computer keyboards. Duzuluslərlə than optimal alignment of the hands so far and at the same time texts saving time reduces the burden.

== The main scientific works ==
1. (2020) Mathematical models of systems with moving servers and their application to lifts’ systems. Intern. Journal Probab. for Engineering and Informational Sciences. 2020.

2. (2020) Statistical Approach in Ecological Prosses. IGI Global Proofing: Handbook of Research on Emerging Developments and Environmental Impacts of Ecological Chemistry 9781799812418. 27/02/2020

3. (2020) Mathematical models of lift systems with various control rules. Gnedenko Forum. RT&A, No. 2(57), Volume 15, June 2020.

4. (2020) Kolmogorov Stories. Intern. Journal Probab. for Engineering and Informational Sciences.Doi:10.1017/S0269964819000494, 2020, p.p. 1-14.

5. (2019) A multi-criteria decision-making method for urban flood resilience evaluation with hybrid uncertainty... International Journal of Disaster Risk Reduction 04/2019; 36:101140.

6. (2019) Mathematical Models of Lift Systems and their simulation. Springer, Ser. Advance in Intelligent Systems and Computing. p.p. 507-519.

7. (2018) Mathematical Models of Particles with Continuous Movement. Proceedings. Intern. Conf. Management Science and Engineering Management. Springer, 2018, p.p. 453-465.

8. (2017) Sustainable Agriculture and Food Security: Implications for Innovation Extension. J. Exp. Biol. Agric. Sci. 2017, 5, p. 108-S115.

9. (2017) Statistical approach for evaluation of reliability for pump systems. Intern. J. Experimental Biology and Agricultural Sciences. ISSN No. 2320 – 8694, 2017.

10. (2016) Optimal choice of parameters in regression models. Lecture Notes in Electrical Engineering, Springer, 2016, v.1

11. (2015) On a distribution function and reliability parameters of busy period pump stations during continuous operation. World Journal of Modelling and Simulation. ISSN 1746-7233, England, UK, Vol. X (XXXX) No. X, 2015, p.p. 3-10.

12. (2015) Математические модели движущихся частиц и их приложения". LAP LAMBERT Academ.Publishing, Germany, 2015.

13. (2014) Statistical Adjustment of the level of groundwater by using a horizontal drain. News of Science and Education, Sheffield: Science and Education LTD, NR 20 (20) 2014, p.p. 26-31

14. (2014) A glimpse into Ecological Engineering based Engineering Management. Intern. J. Management Science and Engineering Management, 2014, v.9, No.4.

15. (2014) Mathematical Models of Moving particles and their Applications for Traffic. Advanced in Intelligent Systems and Computing. Springer-Verlag, Berlin-Heidelberg, 2014, р.р.1-14.

16. (2014) Calculation of queues characteristics with non-stationary input flow. Automatic and Computing Technics, Riga, 2014, No.2.

17. (2014) Calculation of complex queues characteristics. Automatic and Computing Technics, Riga, 2014, No.2.

18. (2013) Risk Analysis in Oil Exploration. İntern. J. Appl. Comp.Mathem., 2013, No.1.

19. (2013) A statistical estimation of reliability in water pipe-line systems. Melioration and water problems.. 2013, No.2, p. 26-28.

20. (2013) Approximate evaluation of the re-liability of CDN on a derivation of excess water from irrigated. Life Science Journal, 2013, No. 10, p.p. 203-208.

21. (2013) Risk Analysis in Oil Exploration. Intern. J. Appl. Comput.Ma-them. 2013, No.1, p. 103-118.

22. (2012) Calculation of queues characteristics with non-stationary input flow. Intern. Journal Electronic modeling, 2012, v.34, No.6, p.p. 35-40.

23. (2012) Queues with moving servers. Simple vertical transportations. Lecture Notes in Electrical Engineering, Springer, 2012, v.2, p.p. 773-785.

24. (2012) Mathematical models of moving particles and applications. Theory of Probab. its Applic. 2012, v.56, No.4, p. 579-589.

25. (2011) Mathematical models of moving particles and their applications. Theory Probab. Its Applic. 2011, No.3.

26. (2011) Mathematical Models of Moving Particles without Overtaking and Applications for Queues. //Proc. Fifth İntern. Conf. Management Science and Engineering Management, Macau, P. R. China, Springer, 2011.

27. (2011) Regression models with increasing numbers of unknown parameters. International Encyclopedia of Statistical Science, Springer, 2011.

28. (2010) Encyclopedia. Theory of Probability and Mathematical Statistics. (in Azerbaijanian). Baku, Elm, 2010, 1300p.

29. (2009) Statistical Approach for finding an Optimal Placement of the Letters of Azeri Alphabet on a Computer Keyboard. Intern. J. Applied and Comput. Mathem. 2009, v.8, No.1.

30. (2007) On solving Statistical Problems for the Stochastic Processes by the Sufficient Empirical Averaging Method. Book: Publ. ”Birkhauser”, Holland, Amsterdam, 2007.

31. (2005) Statistical Analysis of the Regression Models with İncreasing Numbers of Unknown Parameters. Fern Universitat in Hagen, Seminarberichte aus dem Fachbereich Mathematik, Band 76, 2005. pp. 133–146.

32. (2004) Linear regression models with the growing number of unknown parameters. Dokl. RAN, Mathematics. 2004 t. 399, No. 3.

33. (2004) Mathematical theory of regression models with an increasing number of unknown parameters. Nonlinear models. Research Report No.1, 2004. Lincoln University, Oakland, USA.

34. (2002) Control by Delay of a Service Systems. Operation Research, 2002, No. 1, pp. 86–89. Physica-Verlag, Springer-Verlag.

35. (2002) On a standard placement of Letters of Azeri Alphabetic on Keyboard. Trans. Azerb. National Acad. Sci. ser. Phys., Mathem., Techn., 2002, v.12, No. 2, pp. 20–25.

36. (1999) Shuttle systems with random volume systems. Dokl. Russian Academy of Sciences, Mathematics. 1999, v. 380, No. 5.

37. (1995) Estimation of unknown parameters and Construction of a confidence band for unknown functions in regression models. Mathematical Sciences, 1995, v.75, No.6, pp. 42–50.

38. (1989) Statistical evaluation of regression models with dependent errors of observations. Theory of Probab.its applic. 1989, t. 34, No. 4, s. 764–768.

39. (1985) Delays minimizing waiting time in systems with recurrent scientific services. Scandinavian Journal of Statistics, 1985, 12, pp. 301–307.
