= Narrow escape problem =

Singular perturbation problem dealing with confinement of Brownian particles

The narrow escape problem is a ubiquitous problem in biology, biophysics and cellular biology.

The mathematical formulation is the following: a Brownian particle (ion, molecule, or protein) is confined to a bounded domain (a compartment or a cell) by a reflecting boundary, except for a small window through which it can escape. The narrow escape problem is that of calculating the mean escape time. This time diverges as the window shrinks, thus rendering the calculation a singular perturbation problem.

When escape is even more stringent due to severe geometrical restrictions at the place of escape, the narrow escape problem becomes the dire strait problem.

The narrow escape problem was proposed in the context of biology and biophysics by D. Holcman and Z. Schuss, and later on with A.Singer and led to the narrow escape theory in applied mathematics and computational biology.

== Formulation ==
The motion of a particle is described by the Smoluchowski limit of the Langevin equation:
$$dX_t = \sqrt{2D} \, dB_t + \frac{1}{\gamma} F(x) \, dt,$$
where $D$ is the diffusion coefficient of the particle, $\gamma$ is the friction coefficient per unit of mass, $F(x)$ the force per unit of mass, and $B_t$ is a Brownian motion.

== Mean first passage time and the Fokker-Planck equation ==
A common question is to estimate the mean sojourn time of a particle diffusing in a bounded domain $\Omega$ before it escapes through a small absorbing window $\partial\Omega_a$ in its boundary $\partial\Omega$. The time is estimated asymptotically in the limit $\varepsilon = \frac{|\partial\Omega_a|}{|\partial\Omega|} \ll 1$

The probability density function (pdf) $p_{\varepsilon}(x,t)$ is the probability of finding the particle at position $x$ at time $t$.

The pdf satisfies the Fokker–Planck equation:
$$\frac{\partial}{\partial t} p_{\varepsilon}(x,t) = D \Delta p_{\varepsilon}(x,t)-\frac{1}{\gamma}\nabla ( p_\varepsilon (x,t) F(x))$$
with initial condition
$$p_\varepsilon (x,0) = \rho_0(x) \,$$
and mixed Dirichlet–Neumann boundary conditions ($t > 0$)
$$p_\varepsilon (x,t) = 0\text{ for }x \in \partial\Omega_a$$
$$D\frac{\partial}{\partial n}p_\varepsilon (x,t) - \frac{p_\varepsilon (x,t)}{\gamma} F(x)\cdot n(x)=0 \text{ for }x \in \partial \Omega - \partial\Omega_a$$

The function
$$u_\varepsilon (y) = \int_\Omega \int_0^\infty p_\varepsilon (x,t y) \, dt \, dx$$
represents the mean sojourn time of particle, conditioned on the initial position $y$. It is the solution of the boundary value problem

$$D\Delta u_\varepsilon (y) + \frac{1}{\gamma}F(y)\cdot\nabla u_{\varepsilon}(y) = -1$$
$$u_\varepsilon (y) = 0\text{ for }y \in \partial\Omega_a$$
$$\frac{\partial u_\varepsilon (y)}{\partial n} = 0\text{ for }y \in \partial\Omega_r$$

The solution depends on the dimension of the domain. For a particle diffusing on a two-dimensional disk
$$u_\varepsilon (y)=\frac{A}{\pi D}\ln\frac{1}{\varepsilon}+O(1),$$
where $A$ is the surface of the domain. The function $u_{\epsilon}(y)$ does not depend on the initial position $y$, except for a small boundary layer near the absorbing boundary due to the asymptotic form.

The first order term matters in dimension 2: for a circular disk of radius $R$, the mean escape time of a particle starting in the center is
$$E(\tau | x(0)=0 ) = \frac{R^2}{D}\left(\log\left(\frac{1}{\varepsilon}\right) + \log 2 + \frac{1}{4} + O(\varepsilon)\right).$$

The escape time averaged with respect to a uniform initial distribution of the particle is given by
$$E(\tau ) = \frac{R^2}{D}\left(\log\left(\frac{1}{\varepsilon}\right) + \log 2 + \frac{1}{8} + O(\varepsilon)\right).$$

The geometry of the small opening can affect the escape time: if the absorbing window is located at a corner of angle $\alpha$, then:

$$E\tau = \frac{|\Omega|}{\alpha D} \left[\log \frac{1}{\varepsilon} +O(1)\right].$$

More surprising, near a cusp in a two dimensional domain, the escape time $E\tau$ grows algebraically, rather than logarithmically: in the domain bounded between two tangent circles, the escape time is:
$$E\tau = \frac{|\Omega|}{(d-1)D} \left(\frac{1}{\varepsilon} + O(1) \right),$$
where d > 1 is the ratio of the radii. Finally, when the domain is an annulus, the escape time to a small opening located on the inner circle involves a second parameter which is $\beta = {\frac{R_1}{R_2}} < 1,$ the ratio of the inner to the outer radii, the escape time, averaged with respect to a uniform initial distribution, is:
$$E\tau = \frac{(R_2^2 - R_1^2)}D\left[\log \frac{1}{\varepsilon} + \log 2 + 2\beta^2 \right] + \frac{1}{2} \frac{R_2^2}{1-\beta^2} \log\frac{1}{\beta}- \frac{1}{4}R_2^2 + O(\varepsilon,\beta^4)R_2^2.$$

This equation contains two terms of the asymptotic expansion of $E\tau$ and $2\epsilon$ is the angle of the absorbing boundary. The case $\beta$ close to 1 remains open, and for general domains, the asymptotic expansion of the escape time remains an open problem. So does the problem of computing the escape time near a cusp point in three-dimensional domains. For Brownian motion in a field of force
$$F(x) \neq 0$$
the gap in the spectrum is not necessarily small between the first and the second eigenvalues, depending on the relative size of the small hole and the force barriers, the particle has to overcome in order to escape. The escape stream is not necessarily Poissonian.

== Analytical results ==
A theorem that relates the Brownian motion escape problem to a (deterministic) partial differential equation problem is the following.

Theorem— Let $\Omega$ be a bounded domain with smooth boundary $\partial \Omega$ and $\Gamma$ be a closed subset of $\partial\Omega$. For each $x\in\Omega$, let $\tau_{x}$ be the first time of a particle hitting $\Gamma$, assuming that the particle starts from $x$, is subject to the Brownian motion in $\Omega$, and reflects from $\partial\Omega$. Then, the mean first passage time, $T(x):=\mathbb{E}[\tau_{x}]$, and its variance, $v(x):=\mathbb{E} [(\tau_{x}-T(x))^{2}]$, are solutions of the following boundary value problems:
$$- \Delta T = 2 \text{ in } \Omega, ~ T=0 \text{ on } \Gamma, ~ \partial_{n}T=0 \text{ on } \partial \Omega \setminus \Gamma$$
$$- \Delta v = 2 \vert \nabla T \vert^2 \text{ in } \Omega, ~ v=0 \text { on } \Gamma, ~ \partial_n v = 0 \text{ on } \partial \Omega \setminus \Gamma$$

Here $\partial_{n} := n \cdot \nabla$ is the derivative in the direction $n$, the exterior normal to $\partial\Omega.$ Moreover, the average of the variance can be calculated from the formula
$$\bar{v} := \frac{1}{\vert \Omega \vert} \int_{\Omega} v(x) dx= \frac{1}{\vert \Omega \vert} \int_{\Omega} T^2(x) dx =: T^2$$

The first part of the theorem is a classical result, while the average variance was proved in 2011 by Carey Caginalp and Xinfu Chen.

The escape time has been the subject of a number of studies using the small gate as an asymptotically small parameter. The following closed form result gives an exact solution that confirms these asymptotic formulae and extends them to gates that are not necessarily small.

Theorem (Carey Caginalp and Xinfu Chen Closed Formula)—In 2-D, with points identified by complex numbers, let
$$\Omega := \left\{r e^{i \theta} \vert 0 \leq r < 1, \text{ } - \varepsilon \leq \theta \leq 2 \pi - \varepsilon \right\}, ~ \Gamma := \left\{e^{i \theta} \vert \vert \theta \vert \leq \varepsilon \right\}$$

Then the mean first passage time $T(z)$, for $z\in\bar{\Omega}$, is given by
$$T(z) = \frac{1-\vert z \vert^2}{2} + 2 \log{ \left| \frac{1-z+\sqrt{(1-z e^{-i \varepsilon})(1-z e^{i \varepsilon})}}{2\sin{\frac{\varepsilon}{2}}}\right| }$$

Another set of results concerns the probability density of the location of exit.

Theorem (Carey Caginalp and Xinfu Chen Probability Density)—The probability density of the location of a particle at time of its exit is given by
$$\bar{j}(e^{i \theta}) := - \frac{1}{2 \pi} \frac{\partial}{\partial r} T(e^{i \theta}) =
\begin{cases}
0, & \text{if }\varepsilon < \theta < 2 \pi -\varepsilon \\
\frac{1}{2 \pi} \frac{\cos{\frac{\theta}{2}}}{\sqrt {\sin^2{ \frac{\varepsilon}{2}} - \sin^2{ \frac{\theta}{2}}}}, & \text{if } \vert \theta \vert < \varepsilon
\end{cases}$$

That is, for any (Borel set) $\gamma\subset\partial\Omega$, the probability that a particle, starting either at the origin or uniformly distributed in $\Omega$, exhibiting Brownian motion in $\Omega$, reflecting when it hits $\partial\Omega\setminus\Gamma$, and escaping once it hits $\Gamma$, ends up escaping from $\gamma$ is
$$P( \gamma ) = \int_{\gamma} \bar{j}(y) dS_y$$
where $dS_{y}$ is the surface element of $\partial\Omega$ at $y\in \partial\Omega$.

== Simulations of Brownian motion escape ==
In simulation there is a random error due to the statistical sampling process. This error can be limited by appealing to the central limit theorem and using a large number of samples. There is also a discretization error due to the finite size approximation of the step size in approximating the Brownian motion. One can then obtain empirical results as step size and gate size vary. Using the exact result quoted above for the particular case of the circle, it is possible to make a careful comparison of the exact solution with the numerical solution. This illuminates the distinction between finite steps and continuous diffusion. A distribution of exit locations was also obtained through simulations for this problem.

== Biological applications ==
=== Stochastic chemical reactions in microdomains ===
The forward rate of chemical reactions is the reciprocal of the narrow escape time, which generalizes the classical Smoluchowski formula for Brownian particles located in an infinite medium. A Markov description can be used to estimate the binding and unbinding to a small number of sites.

== See also ==
- First-hitting-time model
