= Daniel Gillespie =

American physicist

Daniel Thomas Gillespie
- Born: 15 August 1938; Missouri, U.S.
- Died: 19 April 2017 (aged 78)
- Education: Rice University; Johns Hopkins University
- Known for: Gillespie algorithm
- Scientific career
- Fields: Physics and Stochastic Processes
- Workplaces: University of Maryland, College Park; NAWC China Lake
- Doctoral advisor: Aihud Pevsner
- Other academic advisors: Jan Sengers

Daniel Thomas Gillespie (/ɡɪˈlɛspi/ ghih-LES-pee; 15 August 1938 – 19 April 2017) was a physicist who is best known for his derivation in 1976 of the stochastic simulation algorithm (SSA), also called the Gillespie algorithm. Gillespie's broader research has produced articles on cloud physics, random variable theory, Brownian motion, Markov process theory, electrical noise, light scattering in aerosols, and quantum mechanics.

== Education ==
Born in Missouri, Gillespie grew up in Oklahoma where he graduated from Shawnee High School in 1956. In 1960 he received his B.A. (magna cum laude and Phi Beta Kappa) with a major in physics from Rice University.

Gillespie received his Ph.D. from Johns Hopkins University in 1968 with a dissertation in experimental elementary particle physics under Aihud Pevsner. Part of his dissertation derived procedures for stochastically simulating high-energy elementary particle reactions using digital computers, and Monte Carlo methodology would play a major role in his later work. During his graduate student years at JHU he was also a Jr. Instructor (1960–63) and an Instructor (1966-68) in the sophomore General Physics course.

== Career ==
From 1968 to 1971, Gillespie was a Faculty Research Associate at the University of Maryland College Park's Institute for Molecular Physics. He did research in classical transport theory with Jan Sengers. In 1971 he was also an Instructor in the university's Physics Department.

From 1971 to 2001, Gillespie was a civilian scientist at the Naval Weapons Center in China Lake, California. Initially he was a Research Physicist in the Earth and Planetary Sciences Division. There his research in cloud physics led to a procedure for simulating the growth of raindrops in clouds, and that prompted his paper on the SSA. In 1981 he became Head of the Research Department's Applied Mathematics Research Group, and in 1994 he was made a Senior Scientist in the Research Department. He retired from China Lake in 2001.

From 2001 to 2015, Gillespie was a private consultant in computational biochemistry, working under contract for various periods of time with the California Institute of Technology, the Molecular Sciences Institute (in Berkeley), the Beckman Institute at Caltech, and the University of California, Santa Barbara. Most of this was in collaboration with the Linda Petzold research group in the Computer Sciences Department of UCSB.

== Books by Gillespie ==
- Gillespie, Daniel T. (1970). A Quantum Mechanics Primer. International Textbook Co. pp. 137. ISBN 0700222901. Was in print from 1970 to 1986 by International Textbook Co., International Textbook Co. Ltd, Halstead Press, and Editorial Reverte (Spanish translation).
- Gillespie, Daniel T. (1992). Markov Processes: An Introduction for Physical Scientists. Academic Press. p. 565. ISBN 0122839552.
- Gillespie, Daniel T.; Seitaridou, Effrosyni (2012). Simple Brownian Diffusion: An Introduction to the Standard Theories. Oxford University Press. p. 273. ISBN 9780199664504. An Errata List for this book, including a heavily revised Sec. 5.6, can be downloaded free from the book’s webpage on the publisher’s website.
