= Joseph Glover =

American mathematician

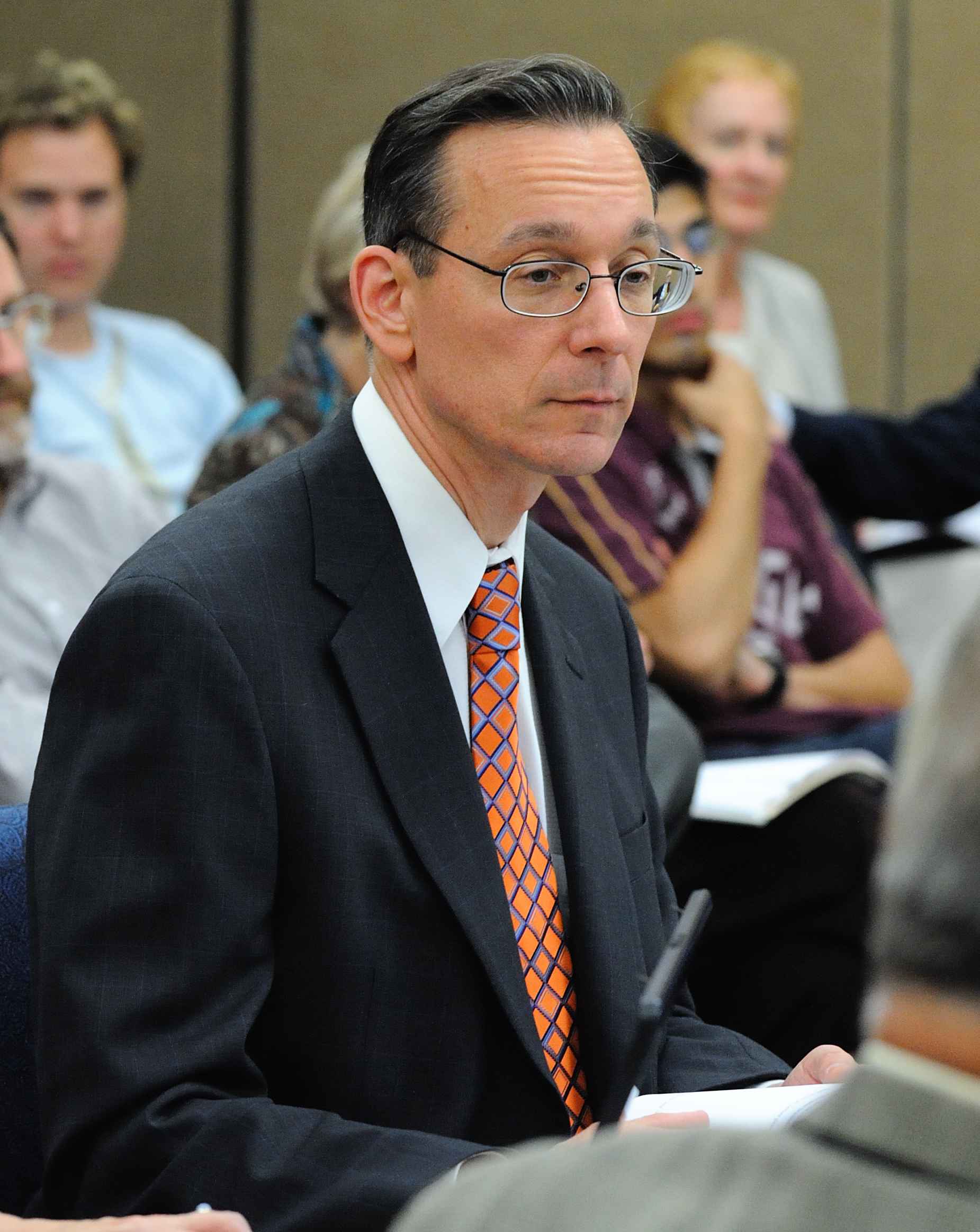
- Glover at the Emerson Alumni Hall in September 2008

Provost of the University of Florida
- In office July 1, 2008 – July 1, 2023; September 6, 2024 – present

Provost of the University of Arizona
- In office July 1, 2024 – August 13, 2024

Dean of the University of Florida College of Liberal Arts and Sciences Acting
- In office January 1, 2007 – July 1, 2008

Personal details
- Education: Cornell University; University of California, San Diego
- Scientific career
- Fields: Probability theory, stochastic processes
- Workplaces: University of Florida; University of Rochester; UC Berkeley
- Thesis: Compactifications for Dual Processes (1978)
- Doctoral advisor: Michael Sharpe

Joseph Glover is an American mathematician and provost of the University of Florida. He was previously provost of the University of Florida from 2008 to 2023 and provost of the University of Arizona from July to August 2024.

== Education ==
Glover attended Cornell University for his bachelor's degree, where classes taught by Leonard Gross, Kiyosi Itô, and Frank Spitzer sparked his interest in probability theory. In 1977, he obtained a master's degree in mathematics from the University of California, San Diego, where he also completed his Ph.D. in 1978 under the supervision of Michael Sharpe.

== Career ==
Glover began his academic career at University of California, Berkeley, and went on to serve as an assistant professor at the University of Rochester from 1979 to 1982.

=== University of Florida ===
In 1982, Glover joined the faculty at the University of Florida as an assistant professor of mathematics. In 1987 he was promoted to full professor, and served as department chair from 1993 to 1998. Glover then served as the associate dean for faculty affairs for the College of Liberal Arts and Sciences. In 2001 he was named Associate Provost for Academic Affairs, and then was promoted to interim dean of the College of Liberal Arts and Science in 2006, and he served in this capacity for the 2007–08 academic year. In July 2008 Glover was appointed Provost of the University of Florida. He served as provost until July 2023, when he stepped down from the position to become senior advisor to the University of Florida's incoming president, Ben Sasse. On 6 September 2024, Glover returned to the University of Florida as provost.

=== University of Arizona ===
In April 2024 it was announced that Glover would be the next provost of the University of Arizona, beginning 1 July 2024. On the day of the announcement, the Tucson Sentinel reported that over 100 University of Arizona faculty had signed a letter opposing Glover's appointment, and supporting instead the appointment of Marie Hardin, a professor at Penn State. Glover notified faculty, staff, and students that he would be resigning from the University of Arizona on August 13th via email.

=== Research ===
Glover's main research areas are Markov processes (in the sense of right, Hunt, and Lévy processes), probabilistic potential theory, and harmonic analysis. He has co-authored papers with Ronald Getoor and Kai Lai Chung, among others.

== Selected publications ==
- Getoor, R. K.; Glover, J. (1984). "Riesz decompositions in Markov process theory". Transactions of the American Mathematical Society. 285 (1): 107–132. doi:10.1090/S0002-9947-1984-0748833-1.
- Glover, J.; Lazer, A. C.; McKenna, P. J. (1989). "Existence and stability of large scale nonlinear oscillations in suspension bridges". Zeitschrift für Angewandte Mathematik und Physik. 40 (2): 172–200. doi:10.1007/BF00944997.
- Glover, Joseph; Mitro, Joanna (1990). "Symmetries and functions of Markov processes". The Annals of Probability. 18 (2): 655–668. doi:10.1214/aop/1176990851.

Academic offices
Preceded by Neil Sullivan	Dean of the University of Florida CLAS; Acting; 2007–2008	Succeeded by Paul D'Anieri
Preceded by Janie Fouke	Provost of the University of Florida; 2008–2023	Succeeded by J. Scott Angle
Preceded by Ronald W. Marx (interim)	Provost of the University of Arizona; July 2024–August 2024	Succeeded by Ronald W. Marx (interim)
Preceded by J. Scott Angle	Provost of the University of Florida; 2024–present	Incumbent
