= Hunt process =

In probability theory, a Hunt process is a type of Markov process, named for mathematician Gilbert A. Hunt who first defined them in 1957. Hunt processes were important in the study of probabilistic potential theory until they were superseded by right processes in the 1970s.

== History ==
=== Background ===
In the 1930-50s the work of mathematicians such as Joseph Doob, William Feller, Mark Kac, and Shizuo Kakutani developed connections between Markov processes and potential theory.

In 1957-8 Gilbert A. Hunt published a triplet of papers which deepened that connection. The impact of these papers on the probabilist community of the time was significant. Joseph Doob said that "Hunt’s great papers on the potential theory generated by Markov transition functions revolutionized potential theory." Ronald Getoor described them as "a monumental work of nearly 170 pages that contained an enormous amount of truly original mathematics." Gustave Choquet wrote that Hunt's papers were "fundamental memoirs which were renewing at the same time potential theory and the theory of Markov processes by establishing a precise link, in a very general framework, between an important class of Markov processes and the class of kernels in potential theory which French probabilists had just been studying."

One of Hunt's contributions was to group together several properties that a Markov process should have in order to be studied via potential theory, which he called "hypothesis (A)". A stochastic process $X$ satisfies hypothesis (A) if the following three assumptions hold:

First assumption: $X$ is a Markov process on a Polish space with càdlàg paths.
Second assumption: $X$ satisfies the strong Markov property.
Third assumption: $X$ is quasi-left continuous on $[0,\infty)$.

Processes satisfying hypothesis (A) soon became known as Hunt processes. If the third assumption is slightly weakened so that quasi-left continuity holds only on the lifetime of $X$, then $X$ is called a "standard process", a term that was introduced by Eugene Dynkin.

=== Rise and fall ===
The book Markov Processes and Potential Theory (1968) by Blumenthal and Getoor codified standard and Hunt processes as the archetypal Markov processes. Over the next few years probabilistic potential theory was concerned almost exclusively with these processes.

Of the three assumptions contained in Hunt's hypothesis (A), the most restrictive is quasi-left continuity. Getoor and Glover write: "In proving many of his results, Hunt assumed certain additional regularity hypotheses about his processes. ... It slowly became clear that it was necessary to remove many of these regularity hypotheses in order to advance the theory." Already in the 1960s attempts were being made to assume quasi-left continuity only when necessary.

In 1970, Chung-Tuo Shih extended two of Hunt's fundamental results, (Note: These are Propositions 2.1 and 2.2 of "Markoff Processes and Potentials I". Blumenthal and Getoor had previously extended these from Hunt processes to standard processes in Theorem III.6.1 of their 1968 book.) completely removing the need for left limits (and thus also quasi-left continuity). This led to the definition of right processes as the new class of Markov processes for which potential theory could work. Already in 1975, Getoor wrote that Hunt processes were "mainly of historical interest". By the time that Michael Sharpe published his book "General Theory of Markov Processes" in 1988, Hunt and standard processes were considered obsolete in probabilistic potential theory.

Hunt processes are still studied by mathematicians, most often in relation to Dirichlet forms.

== Definition ==
=== Brief definition ===
A Hunt process $X$ is a strong Markov process on a Polish space that is càdlàg and quasi-left continuous; that is, if $(T_n)$ is an increasing sequence of stopping times with limit $T$, then
$$\mathbb P\big(\lim_{n\to\infty} X_{T_n} = X_T \big| T < \infty\big) = 1.$$

=== Verbose definition ===
Let $E$ be a Radon space and $\mathcal E$ the $\sigma$-algebra of universally measurable subsets of $E$, and let $(P_t)$ be a Markov semigroup on $(E,\mathcal E)$ that preserves $\mathcal E$. A Hunt process is a collection $X = (\Omega, \mathcal G, \mathcal G_t, X_t, \theta_t, \mathbb P^x)$ satisfying the following conditions:

(i) $(\Omega, \mathcal G, \mathcal G_t)$ is a filtered measurable space, and each $\mathbb P^x$ is a probability measure on $(\Omega, \mathcal G)$.
(ii) For every $x\in E$, $X_t$ is an $E$-valued stochastic process on $(\Omega, \mathcal G, \mathbb P^x)$, and is adapted to $(\mathcal G_t)$.
(iii) (normality) For every $x\in E$, $\mathbb P^x(X_0 = x) = 1$.
(iv) (Markov property) For every $x\in E$, and for all $t,s\ge 0, f\in b\mathcal E$, $\mathbb E^x(f(X_{t+s}) | \mathcal G_t) = P_sf(X_t)$.
(v) $(\theta_t)_{t\ge 0}$ is a collection of maps $:\Omega\to\Omega$ such that for each $t,s\ge0$, $\theta_t \circ \theta_s = \theta_{t+s}$ and $X_t\circ\theta_s = X_{t+s}.$
(vi) $(\mathcal G_t)$ is augmented and right continuous.
(vii) (right-continuity) For every $x\in E$, every $\alpha>0$, and every $\alpha$-excessive (with respect to $(P_t)$) function $f$, the map $t\mapsto f(X_t)$ is almost surely right continuous under $\mathbb P^x$.
(viii) (quasi-left continuity) For every $x\in E$, if $(T_n)$ is an increasing sequence of stopping times with limit $T$, then $\mathbb P^x(\lim_{n\to\infty} X_{T_n} = X_T | T < \infty) = 1$.

Sharpe shows in Lemma 2.6 that conditions (i)-(v) imply measurability of the map $x\mapsto \mathbb P^x(X_t\in B)$ for all $B\in\mathcal E$, and in Theorem 7.4 that (vi)-(vii) imply the strong Markov property with respect to $(\mathcal G_t)$.

== Connection to other Markov processes ==
The following inclusions hold among various classes of Markov process:

{Lévy} $\subset$ {Itô} $\subset$ {Feller} $\subset$ {Hunt} $\subset$ {special standard} $\subset$ {standard} $\subset$ {right} $\subset$ {strong Markov}

=== Time-changed Itô processes ===
In 1980 Çinlar et al. proved that any real-valued Hunt process is semimartingale if and only if it is a random time-change of an Itô process. More precisely, a Hunt process $X$ on $\mathbb R^m$ (equipped with the Borel $\sigma$-algebra) is a semimartingale if and only if there is an Itô process $Y$ and a measurable function $f$ with $0< f\le 1$ such that $X_t = Y_{A_t}, t\ge0$, where
$$A_t = \inf_{u> 0} \Big\{\int_0^u f(Y_s) \mathrm{d} s > t \Big\}.$$
Itô processes were first named due to their role in this theorem, after Kiyosi Itô who had previously studied them.

== See also ==
- Markov process
- Borel right process
- Gilbert Hunt

== Sources ==
- Blumenthal, Robert M. and Getoor, Ronald K. "Markov Processes and Potential Theory". Academic Press, New York, 1968.
- Hunt, G. A. "Markoff Processes and Potentials. I, II, III.", Illinois J. Math. 1 (1957) 44–93; 1 (1957), 313–369; 2 (1958), 151–213.
