= Markov Processes and Potential Theory =

1968 book by Robert M. Blumenthal and Ronald K. Getoor

- Cover of the 2007 Dover facsimile edition
- Authors: Robert M. Blumenthal; Ronald K. Getoor
- Language: English
- Subject: Probability theory
- Publisher: Academic Press
- Publication date: 1968
- ISBN: 9780121078508

Markov Processes and Potential Theory is a mathematics book written by Robert McCallum Blumenthal and Ronald Getoor. It was first published in 1968 by Academic Press, and remained an influential reference work for several decades. Getoor, in his obituary of Blumenthal, referred to the book as "undoubtedly, our best known work".

== Background ==
Markov Processes and Potential Theory is based on, and extends, Gilbert Hunt's work on probabilistic potential theory, in particular his three-part paper "Markoff Processes and Potentials", which was published in the Illinois Journal of Mathematics in 1957–1958. Blumenthal wrote his doctoral thesis with Hunt at Cornell University in 1956, and that year started working at the University of Washington, where he met Getoor.

In a 1980 interview with Eugene Dynkin, Getoor said that he and Blumenthal began studying Hunt's papers together in 1960, and by 1965 had decided to write a book on the topic. (Note: At 11:40 Getoor says "in the summer of [19]60 Blumenthal and I decided to make a real effort to read Hunt's papers, which we did over the next several years". At 24:57 he says "in 1965, that was the year I was spending at Stanford...at that time Blumenthal and I had already decided to write the book".) They had written a draft by 1966, and finished the book by correspondence in 1966–1967 while Blumenthal was working in Germany.

== Content ==
The main object of study in Markov Processes and Potential Theory is the standard process, a slight generalisation of the Hunt process, which Joanna Mitro describes as "the largest class of Markov processes for which there was well-developed associated potential theory at that time." The chapters are:

1. Markov processes
2. Excessive functions
3. Multiplicative functionals and subprocesses
4. Additive functionals and their potentials
5. Further properties of continuous additive functionals
6. Dual processes and potential theory

Chapter I covers the Markov property and strong Markov property, Markov kernels, standard and Hunt processes, and measurability of hitting times. Theorem 9.4 contains the fact that a Feller semigroup induces a Hunt process, and Theorem 10.6 is Gustave Choquet's capacity theorem. The chapter introduces the notation $(\Omega, \mathcal F, \mathcal F_t, X_t, \theta_t, P_x)$ for a Markov process, which was widely adopted.

Chapter II addresses the content of Hunt's "Markoff Processes and Potentials I", and includes excessive functions and the fine topology. Chapter III covers Hunt's "Markoff Processes and Potentials II", and includes what Paul-André Meyer calls the "main balayage theorem" (Theorem 6.12), as well as subprocesses and multiplicative functionals. Chapter IV introduces additive functionals, and Chapter V applies various contemporary theorems to them, including the work of Minoru Motoo, Edward S. Boylan, and Henry McKean. Chapter VI is concerned with Hunt's "Markoff Processes and Potentials III", and covers dual processes, potentials of measures, and capacity.

== Reception ==
=== Contemporary reception ===
Markov Processes and Potential Theory was positively received in contemporary reviews. In a 1970 review for the Annals of Mathematical Statistics, Harry Dym described the book as "impressive and important" and wrote that it "will surely serve as a basic reference on Markov processes and potential theory for years to come." Paul-André Meyer wrote in a 1969 review for the Bulletin of the American Mathematical Society that "every mathematician interested in time continuous Markov processes should know this book." Statistician M. S. Bartlett was critical of the level of abstraction, writing in his 1972 review for the Mathematical Gazette that "many branches of pure mathematics, including measure-theoretic probability, are becoming too rarefied to have any very discernible connection with the applied problems which generated them in the first instance".

=== Legacy ===
In 1989 Chris Rogers wrote: "Some 21 years ago, the celebrated volume Markov processes and potential theory by Blumenthal and Getoor was published. Since then, it has become one of the most frequently cited books in the subject". The book is often referenced in later probability theory books; Kai Lai Chung and John B. Walsh call it "the standard reference on duality" in their book Markov Processes, Brownian Motion, and Time Symmetry, and in Continuous Martingales and Brownian Motion, Daniel Revuz and Marc Yor write that "the basic reference for additive functionals is the book of Blumenthal and Getoor from which most of our proofs [for the chapter] are borrowed".

Markov Processes and Potential Theory was in part superseded by Michael Sharpe's 1988 book General Theory of Markov Processes, which treated the more general Borel right process and also covered topics that Blumenthal and Getoor had not, including the Ray–Knight compactification, Lévy systems, characteristic measures, the Martin boundary, and excursion theory.
