= Fouke =

Fouke may refer to:

== People ==
- Fouke or Fulk FitzWarin (c. 1160–c. 1258), English outlaw
- Fouke Salisbury, Welsh Anglican Dean of St Asaph from 1511 to 1543
- Harry Fouke (1913–1992), American university athletic director
- Janie Fouke, American biomedical engineer
- Philip B. Fouke (1818–1876), American politician

== Other uses ==
- Fouke, Arkansas, United States, a city
  - Fouke High School
- Fouke, Texas, United States, an unincorporated community

== See also ==
- Fouke Monster, in Arkansas folklore a legendary creature similar to Bigfoot
