= Zero–one law =

In probability theory, a zero–one law is a result that states that an event must have probability 0 or 1 and no intermediate value. Sometimes, the statement is that the limit of certain probabilities must be 0 or 1.

It may refer to:

- Borel–Cantelli lemma,
- Blumenthal's zero–one law for Markov processes,
- Engelbert–Schmidt zero–one law for continuous, nondecreasing additive functionals of Brownian motion,
- Hewitt–Savage zero–one law for exchangeable sequences,
- Kolmogorov's zero–one law for the tail σ-algebra,
- Lévy's zero–one law, related to martingale convergence,
- Gaussian process § Driscoll's zero-one law.

Outside the area of probability, it may refer to:

- Topological zero–one law, related to meager sets,
- Zero-one law (logic) for sentences valid in finite structures.
