= Paul D'Anieri =

American academic administrator

- Born: Niskayuna, New York, U.S.
- Spouse: Laura D'Anieri
- Awards: Fulbright Scholar

Academic background
- Education: Michigan State University (BA); Cornell University (MA, PhD)

Paul J. D'Anieri is Professor of Public Policy and Political Science, and former Executive Vice Chancellor & Provost of University of California, Riverside. Prior to his position at UCR, D'Anieri served at the University Kansas as the dean of the University of Florida College of Liberal Arts and Sciences (CLAS) from 2008 until 2014, as the Associate Dean for Humanities from 2004 to 2008, and as the Associate Dean for International Programs from 1999 to 2003.

D'Anieri is a political scientist specializing in politics and international relations in the former Soviet Union, focusing on Ukraine and Russia. He is also considered an expert on economics, finance, and budgeting in US universities, which became a focus during his administrative career.

D'Anieri received his bachelor's degree from Michigan State University in International Relations in 1986. He then went on to earn a master's degree and doctorate in government from Cornell University in 1991.

== Academic career ==
D'Anieri has been called "one of the leading scholars of the study of contemporary Ukraine"

D'Anieri's research focuses on politics and foreign policy in the post-Soviet states with particular focus on Ukrainian politics and Ukraine's relations with Russia. He spent 1993–1994 in Ukraine on a Fulbright Grant and has written a number of books and articles about the politics of Ukraine. He has received several awards for his work, including a Fulbright Grant, a Fellowship from the Smith-Richardson Foundation, and several grants from the US government totaling over a million dollars.

D'Anieri presciently brought to readers' attention the activity in Ukraine of the US political consultant Paul Manafort in a chapter published in 2013, ("Autocratic Diffusion and the Pluralization of Democracy," in Power in a Complex Global System edited by Louis W. Pauly, Bruce W. Jentleson, p. 87) In the fall of 2017, he served as the Eugene and Daymel Shklar Research Fellow at Harvard University, where he conducted research for a book tentatively titled "From 'Civilized Divorce' to Uncivil War: Russia, Ukraine, and the West, 1991–2017."

D'Anieri's first book, Economic Interdependence in Ukrainian-Russian Relations, (SUNY, 1999) examined the dilemmas Ukraine faced in trying to be politically independent from Russia while remaining highly interdependent economically. He showed that the Ukraine-Russia relationship was unlikely to resolve itself, and that Ukraine's ability or inability to reform domestically would strongly condition its ability to achieve the autonomy and sovereignty its leaders coveted. Writing in the American Political Science Review, Yaroslav Belinsky called the book "ambitious [...] well-researched and documented [and] clearly written."

Slavic Review wrote that "D'Anieri's book provides a vivid discussion of the developing relationship between these two important countries, thereby opening a forum for what will certainly be a fascinating topic for years to come." Sherman W. Garnett of The Carnegie Endowment for International Peace wrote that D'Anieri "has taken an important topic in a new and important aspect of international relations and competently illuminated its many facets."

Another reviewer wrote: "the book offers a sound practical and theoretical footing on which to understand the issues surrounding Ukrainian-Russian interdependence, as they currently stand and as they may be played out in the future."

D'Anieri's second book, Understanding Ukrainian Politics: Power, Politics, and Institutional Design (2007), delved into Ukraine's internal politics to show how and why it seemed unable to consolidate democracy, while also resisting authoritarianism. In the Russian Review, Taras Kuzio wrote that D'Anieri "accurately predicted, as seen in the 2007 constitutional crisis, that the reforms could lead to stalemate and increased presidential-parliamentary conflict," and that the book "makes an original contribution to contemporary studies of Ukrainian politics by integrating political science theory into Ukrainian politics and placing this within a comparative context."

Writing in the Journal of Ukrainian Studies, the eminent Canadian scholar of Ukraine Bohdan Harasymiw wrote "D'Anieri's new book transcends all earlier work on Ukrainian politics."

A review in the specialist journal Europe-Asia Studies called Understanding Ukrainian Politics "one of the very best books published on the subject, and undoubtedly, one of the most remarkable examples of first-class political science research on East European and post-Communist transitions."

In 2011, D'Anieri published the edited volume Orange Revolution and Aftermath: Mobilization, Apathy and the State in Ukraine (Johns Hopkins University Press/Woodrow Wilson Center). A reviewer said the collected essays "make a profound contribution to the study of Ukrainian civil society and its evolving relationship to the state."

Dilemmas of State-Led Nation Building in Ukraine, (Westport, CT: Praeger, 2002), which D'Anieri co-edited with Taras Kuzio was named a Choice "Outstanding Academic Book" of 2003.

D'Anieri's widely used textbook, International Politics: Power and Purpose in Global Affairs, is in its fourth edition. Reviewers said: "The writing style is compelling, the coverage of theories is strong, and the boxes are good at promoting critical thinking" and "The section on terrorism is the best I've read in an intro book--concise and balanced." Another said: "I have adopted the D'Anieri textbook in the past and will do so again in the future because it is one of the best, if not the best, IR textbook available in the U.S. at this time." Reviews of the second addition included statements such as: "The first truly student-oriented text on this subject, INTERNATIONAL POLITICS: POWER AND PURPOSE IN GLOBAL AFFAIRS is a full-length, highly engaging introduction to the study of world politics". D'Anieri's cohesive pedagogical framework presents the study of international politics as a series of intellectual puzzles and policy problems that help students make the connection between power and purpose, continuity and change, emerging problems and traditional ones. He also addresses common student deficiencies in history, policy, culture, and geography through case studies of real-world events, and emphasizes that a better understanding of international relations can often be gained by examining problems from multiple approaches."

In 1997, D'Anieri received a prestigious Kemper Fellowship for Excellence in Teaching. At the time, he was the only assistant professor ever to have received the award, which singled out his "teaching and advising at the Freshman-Sophomore level." D'Anieri also earned praise from the graduate students he worked with. One said "Paul D'Anieri taught me the value of good research design, particularly having a good research question and a strong thesis."

== Administrative career ==
D'Anieri is a sought after speaker on how universities can manage the financial challenges they face while maintaining their focus on their academic mission. He has worked extensively with the American Council of Education providing training for department chairs and for rising higher education executives. He is known for work in three related areas: Implementation of Responsibility Center Management, the measurement of instructional costs through Activity Based Costing, and the broader topic of how budgeting systems can help or impede connecting universities to their mission.

=== University of Kansas ===
A year after receiving tenure at the University of Kansas, D'Anieri was named associate dean of international programs, a position in which he served from 1999 to 2003. Among his major accomplishments was chairing a task force convened to determine how to make it possible for every KU undergraduate to have a "significant international experience." The result was the KU "Global Awareness Program," which is still in place today, and was adopted at other institutions, including East Carolina University. He continued his focus on internationalization by developing a new strategy at the University of Florida and by hiring the first vice provost of international affairs at the University of California Riverside.

From 2003 to 2004, D'Anieri was director of the Center for Russian and East European Studies at the University of Kansas, where he "continued the tradition of excellence in CREES leadership". D'Anieri was principal investigator on the center's $786,000 Title VI National Resource Center grant from the US Department of Education, as well as a grant through the Freedom Support Act to develop "Critical New and Expanded Capabilities in the Social Sciences in Ukraine."

From 2004 to 2008, D'Anieri was associate dean for humanities in the College of Liberal Arts and Sciences at the University of Kansas. This was the first time someone from a non-humanities department had been asked to serve in the position. D'Anieri oversaw a major overhaul of the main humanities building, Wescoe Hall. He also had the undergraduate education portfolio in the college, and oversaw a reform of general education requirements and a strengthening of academic integrity rules and processes. D'Anieri was instrumental in forging a partnership between KU and the US Army's nearby base at Ft. Leavenworth, a major component of which was a program to educate officers about cultural aptitude.

=== University of Florida ===
In 2008, D'Anieri was recruited to be the dean of the College of Liberal Arts and Sciences at the University of Florida, that campus's largest college, teaching over 35,000 students each year. Florida President Bernie Machen said "Paul is a rising star and he has a fresh perspective and a lot of new ideas." D'Anieri's tenure at Florida, which coincided with the Great Recession, was characterized by increasing achievement with reduced resources.

Among D'Anieri's major accomplishments at Florida were the adoption of a new CLAS strategic plan, the development of a new interdisciplinary humanities course, called "What is the Good Life?" to be required of all UF undergraduates, the successful completion of the CLAS portion of Florida's $1.7 billion "Florida Tomorrow" campaign, and creation of new undergraduate programs in sustainability studies, international studies and medical humanities.

In collaboration with UF's College of Medicine, D'Anieri helped start the UF Health Disparities Research and Intervention Program to "train at least 360 health workers in Alachua, Gadsden and Volusia counties over eight months." Michael Good, M.D., dean of the UF College of Medicine called the project "a fine example of how strong collaborations between researchers and communities can give people the tools they need to change their lives for the better."

The university was dealing with a significant budget crisis. The Florida Alligator said at the time "Simply put, there is no solution that won't leave someone unhappy." D'Anieri said: "The budget occupies a great deal of my time, and it should. The more frugally we spend our money, the more we will have to invest in our students and faculty. But the budget does not define us. We are defined by our people, and by our passion for what we do and our commitment to UF." In discussing the process for mandated budget cuts, D'Anieri stressed his "commitment to transparency" and shared budget data with faculty, while also recognizing he must take responsibility for hard decisions being made. D'Anieri responded to budget cuts initially by reorganizing the dean's office to reduce the number of associate dean positions. In a subsequent budget cut, D'Anieri managed to avoid elimination of faculty positions via creation of a shared services center that dramatically reduced administrative costs. In 2009, Psychology Department Chair Neil Rowland wrote "We are very pleased that Dr Paul D'Anieri came from the University of Kansas to be the new Dean of CLAS as of July, and I know these are not the kind of challenges that he had envisioned in his first year!"

He was deeply involved in UFs adoption of Responsibility Center Management, making numerous suggestions on how the model could serve rather than undermine the academic mission. "He became a master of the new Responsibility Center Management budgeting system that was instituted during his tenure, and his expertise in fiscal management and strategic planning served the college well," said UF Provost Joe Glover.

He organized the transfer of the department of economics and the bureau of business and economic research from the Warrington College of Business into Liberal Arts and Sciences in 2013 when "the entire Economics Department [was] under threat of extinction".

When D'Anieri left Florida, the Gainesville Sun reported on faculty reaction. "Paul Ortiz, director of the Samuel Proctor Oral History Program, said Wednesday that D'Anieri was a respected intellectual and academic scholar who continued to teach in the classroom even as an administrator."

"Too many universities have people in academic leadership posts who don't understand the academic mission," Ortiz said. "A lot of academics give up teaching when they become deans, that is bad for college or university [...] He stepped in really at the beginning of the budget crisis," said Ortiz, who came to UF around the same time as D'Anieri. "I know he was frustrated by that and we all were."

=== University of California-Riverside ===
In 2014, D'Anieri was recruited to become executive vice chancellor and provost at the University of California, Riverside. Chancellor Kim Wilcox said at the time: "He is a seasoned academic administrator, an authoritative scholar, and an inspiring leader who deeply understands the University of California's mission of providing excellence in research, teaching, and public service." His charge was "implementation of the campus strategic plan, UCR 2020: The Path to Preeminence." The strategic plan, which aspired to give UCR the profile of members of the Association of American Universities, (the top 62 research universities in the country, such as Harvard, Stanford and Berkeley), focused on goals including improving student graduation rates, increasing external research funding, and diversifying the faculty.

At UC Riverside, D'Anieri and vice chancellor for planning and budget Maria Anguiano led a pilot project intended to better understand how the costs of different teaching approaches relate to their outcomes. "Working in tandem, University of California Riverside's Chief Business Officer Maria Anguiano and Provost Paul D'Anieri are transforming the university's approach to resource deployment decision-making with activity-based costing (ABC). A project is underway to provide deans and other academic leaders with the information needed to make optimal decisions about course delivery to enhance student success." The project was funded by the Gates Foundation, and involved collaboration with Reengineering the University author William Massey of Stanford University. It involved the must sustained effort to apply ABC in a university to date, and produced a white paper evaluating the strengths and limitations of the approach.

In 2014–15, UCR considered merging its College of Natural and Agricultural Resources with the College of Humanities, Arts and Social Sciences, but after getting input from faculty, D'Anieri decided to shelve the idea, saying in an email to the campus, "Based on the feedback we received throughout this discussion, there is considerable support for the underlying goal of devolving responsibility to the schools/colleges and their deans, but not for forming a college of Arts and Sciences as a way of promoting it. We will continue to work toward that goal through our budget redesign process and through other campus efforts."

In 2015, D'Anieri forged a humanities partnership with the Huntington Library in Pasadena that is "believed to be the first partnership of its kind in the country." "This is a regional idea with national implications," said Laura Skandera Trombley, president of The Huntington. "[I]t makes much more sense to go about it with a partner institution that is interested in going against the grain, taking a few risks, and not only making a statement, but making an impact. We found that in UCR and are delighted to be launching this new endeavor."

D'Anieri has been a leader in developing policies to increase faculty diversity. While at Florida, he contributed to a project by the American Association for the Advancement of Science on diversifying the faculty without using racial preferences, which had been prohibited. The cluster hiring program he instituted at UCR was the subject of an article in InsideHigherEd. "We believe that will help us to further diversify one of the country's most diverse research universities, and will help to build new areas of strength," D'Anieri said. "Obviously, any program as innovative as this will spur some opposition, and we welcome good suggestions about this novel process." Robert A. Hanneman, a "longtime faculty member in the sociology department," said the new process "allows younger and other faculty marginalized by the power structure to have greater input."

"If we are going to hire as many people we are going to hire in the next five years [...] if we do not substantially diversify this faculty and if we do not in fact create the most diverse faculty of any major research university, we'll have failed," D'Anieri stated. In response to complaints about the program, one faculty member wrote "Every faculty member that I know who is participating in these searches is highly involved and very excited."

Shortly after D'Anieri's departure, the hiring program he led was the topic of a highly laudatory article in InsideHigherEd, titled "Making Diversity Happen: Boston College and UC Riverside share how they quickly hired more faculty members from underrepresented minority groups, without relying on hard numerical targets or costly initiatives." Under the plan D'Anieri was later criticized for, InsideHigherEd reported, "Riverside over the past two hiring cycles recruited 35 new underrepresented-minority faculty members, comprising upwards of 22 percent of all new hires. Historically that figure has been about 13 percent of new hires. And in the most recent cycle, 30 percent of all new minority hires were in the natural sciences, technology, math and engineering. That's significantly higher than the university's current underrepresented-minority faculty population of approximately 10 percent. And it brings Riverside's professoriate closer to reflecting the diversity of its students, as 45 percent of undergraduates at the university are from an underrepresented minority background. The share of hires who were women also increased."

Speaking at UCR in October 2016, Ted Mitchell, the U.S. Under Secretary for Education said: "I wish we could clone what is happening at UC Riverside and bring it to every college and university in the country," he said. "You are showing the kinds of partnerships, the kinds of commitments, that need to be made if we are going to reach President Obama's goal, to have the kind of higher education system that supports a diverse democracy."

==== Controversy and return to research ====
The rapid pace of change at UCR made many faculty members uneasy, and in the fall of 2016, a town hall meeting was called to address faculty concerns. D'Anieri and Wilcox listened to complaints about their handling of new faculty hires, their tendency to "publicly dismiss and ridicule" faculty concerns, and their "lack [of] respect for long-standing campus policies and processes." Despite claiming that "D'Anieri should not be blamed for decisions [...] that were made collectively by senior administrators," including a "cluster hiring" initiative that had drawn criticism from the Faculty Senate over planning and implementation, the Faculty Senate announced that a vote of no confidence in D'Anieri would be called. Rather than face that vote, D'Anieri resigned as provost, saying that divisions over how to move forward "have made it difficult to achieve the level of unity that I believe we need to move forward on our ambitious agenda."

On December 16, 2016, D'Anieri tendered his resignation as Executive Vice Chancellor & Provost of UC Riverside rather than face a vote of no confidence by the Faculty Senate, whose members strongly objected to his "top-down" leadership style, his contempt for shared governance, and the "climate of fear and mistrust" he and UC Riverside Chancellor Kim A. Wilcox had generated on campus. Over 100 faculty called for the Senate to act, which Senate Chair Dylan Rodriguez has acknowledged was an "unprecedented" show of opposition to a sitting provost. According to Rodriguez, "If you have 100-plus faculty that are questioning the integrity of shared governance at that fundamental a level, it's serious."

At a town hall meeting prior to the resignation, D'Anieri and Wilcox listened to complaints about their incompetent handling of new faculty hires, their tendency to "publicly dismiss and ridicule" faculty concerns, and their "lack [of] respect for long-standing campus policies and processes." Despite claiming that "D'Anieri should not be blamed for decisions [...] that were made collectively by senior administrators," including a "cluster hiring" initiative that had drawn criticism from the Faculty Senate for its extremely poor planning, Wilcox accepted his resignation.

In a letter to the UCR campus, D'Anieri attributed his problems to "significant differences of opinion" between him and the faculty "on several fundamental issues." D'Anieri will return to his faculty position at the end of the 2016–17 academic year while a search for a new provost is mounted. Despite his decision to resign, the Faculty Senate has announced that it will proceed with their no confidence motion.

"If there's a hero in this, it's Paul D'Anieri," said UCR Chancellor Kim Wilcox. "Paul brought courageous leadership, deep commitment and innovative thinking to his role as chief academic officer," Wilcox said. "It's hard to imagine having achieved so much so quickly without his steady hand." "[W]e have moved very far, very fast," Wilcox said. "That magnitude and speed of change is hard for anyone to adjust to." "Wilcox declared himself as the appropriate target for all concerns directed at D'Anieri, acknowledging that the provost did everything with his approval." "Under D'Anieri, the campus had "made important strides in student success, research stature, and faculty diversity," Wilcox said in a written statement."

"I am very proud of what we have accomplished," stated D'Anieri in his resignation letter. "In the two-plus years I have been at UCR, every major indicator of our success is up dramatically: applications, graduation rates, research funding, and the diversity of our senior administration and our newly hired faculty."

By the time of D'Anieri's resignation:

- Four and Six year graduation rates were up 11 and 7 percent, respectively, earning UCR the "Project Degree Completion Award" from the Association of Public and Land Grant Universities. D'Anieri received the award from APLU board chair Bernadette Grey-Little in November 2016. APLU President Peter McPherson said "UC Riverside's comprehensive approach to improving degree completion puts it at the leading edge of those efforts."
- Speaking at UCR in October 2016, Ted Mitchell, the U.S. Under Secretary for Education said: "I wish we could clone what is happening at UC Riverside and bring it to every college and university in the country," he said. "You are showing the kinds of partnerships, the kinds of commitments, that need to be made if we are going to reach President Obama's goal, to have the kind of higher education system that supports a diverse democracy."
- UCR federal research awards increased 35 percent to $107M.
- In late 2016, it was announced that "UC Riverside Has Set New Records For Student Applications And Admissions."
- The rate of underprepresented minorities in the annual hiring cohort had nearly doubled, and the number of women in the cohort increased by 8 percent result.

== Post-administrative career ==
After stepping down as provost at UC Riverside in February 2017, D'Anieri returned to his research on Ukraine and Russia, and continued assisting other universities interested in improving their financial and budgeting practices.

He spent the fall semester of 2017 as the Eugene and Daymel Shklar Research Fellow at Harvard University, where he conducted research for a book tentatively titled "From 'Civilized Divorce' to Uncivil War: Russia, Ukraine, and the West, 1991–2017." While at Harvard, he presented an early look at the project: "My research at HURI is focusing on the long-term sources of Russia's invasion of Ukraine. I am looking at the problem both chronologically and thematically. The problem of democracy and the spread of democracy is one that comes up again and again. In the 1990s, people in the West generally assumed that the spread of democracy would be a source of peace in the region, but by 2013, Russia saw democratization as a threat worth fighting over. I want to delve into how and why that happened."

He also continued his work on University finance and budgeting, designing a curriculum on the topic for the American Council on Education, working in particular with the ACE Fellows Program, "The nation's premier higher education leadership development program preparing senior leaders to serve American colleges and universities." In the 2018–19 academic year, D'Anieri will teach a course on the topic in the School of Public Policy at UC Riverside.

Academic offices
Preceded by Joseph Glover; Acting	Dean of the University of Florida; College of Liberal Arts and Sciences; 2008–2014	Incumbent
