= Daniel Burrill Ray =

American mathematician (1928-1979)

Daniel Burrill Ray (5 February 1928, Cleveland, Ohio – 19 February 1979) was an American mathematician. He is known for Ray-Singer torsion.

Ray received his bachelor's degree summa cum laude in 1949 from Harvard College and his Ph.D. from Cornell University in 1953 under Mark Kac with thesis On Spectra of Second Order Differential Operators. As a postdoc he was a Frank B. Jewett Fellow in 1953/54 at Bell Laboratories. From 1957 to 1979 he was a professor at Massachusetts Institute of Technology.

In 1958, 1959, 1960 and 1961 he was at the Institute for Advanced Study. He was a Sloan Fellow.

== Selected publications ==
- On spectra of second-order differential operators. Trans. Amer. Math. Soc. 77 (1954) 299–321. doi:10.1090/S0002-9947-1954-0066539-2
- Stationary Markov processes with continuous paths. Trans. Amer. Math. Soc. 82 (1956) 452–493. doi:10.1090/S0002-9947-1956-0102857-9
- Stable processes with an absorbing barrier. Trans. Amer. Math. Soc. 89 (1958) 16–24. doi:10.1090/S0002-9947-1958-0105178-5
- with R. M. Blumenthal and R. K. Getoor: On the distribution of first hits for the symmetric stable processes. . Trans. Amer. Math. Soc. 99 (1961) 540–554. doi:10.1090/S0002-9947-1961-0126885-4
- Sojourn times and the exact Hausdorff measure of the sample path for planar Brownian motion . Trans. Amer. Math. Soc. 106 (1963) 436–444. doi:10.1090/S0002-9947-1963-0145599-X
