= Blumenthal's zero–one law =

In the mathematical theory of probability, Blumenthal's zero–one law, named after Robert McCallum Blumenthal, is a statement about the nature of the beginnings of right continuous Feller process. Loosely, it states that any right continuous Feller process on $[0,\infty)$ starting from deterministic point has also deterministic initial movement.

== Statement ==
Suppose that $X=(X_t:t\geq 0)$ is an adapted right continuous Feller process on a probability space $(\Omega,\mathcal{F},\{\mathcal{F}_{t}\}_{t\geq 0},\mathbb{P})$ such that $X_0$ is constant with probability one. Let $\mathcal{F}^X_t:=\sigma(X_s; s\leq t), \mathcal{F}^X_{t^+}:=\bigcap_{s>t}\mathcal{F}^X_s$. Then any event in the germ sigma algebra $\Lambda \in \mathcal{F}^X_{0+}$ has either $\mathbb{P}(\Lambda)=0$ or $\mathbb{P}(\Lambda)=1.$

== Generalization ==
Suppose that $X=(X_t:t\geq 0)$ is an adapted stochastic process on a probability space $(\Omega,\mathcal{F},\{\mathcal{F}_{t}\}_{t\geq 0},\mathbb{P})$ such that $X_0$ is constant with probability one. If $X$ has Markov property with respect to the filtration $\{\mathcal{F}_{t^+}\}_{t\geq 0}$ then any event $\Lambda \in \mathcal{F}^X_{0+}$ has either $\mathbb{P}(\Lambda)=0$ or $\mathbb{P}(\Lambda)=1.$ Note that every right continuous Feller process on a probability space $(\Omega,\mathcal{F},\{\mathcal{F}_{t}\}_{t\geq 0},\mathbb{P})$ has strong Markov property with respect to the filtration $\{\mathcal{F}_{t^+}\}_{t\geq 0}$.
