= University of Florida College of Liberal Arts and Sciences =

Academic college of the University of Florida

College of Liberal Arts and Sciences
- Type: Public
- Established: 1910
- Parent institution: University of Florida
- Dean: Dr. Mary Watt (Interim)
- Undergraduates: 11,000
- Postgraduates: 1,500
- Location: Gainesville, Florida, United States; 29°38′56.9″N 82°20′38.8″W
- Website: www.clas.ufl.edu

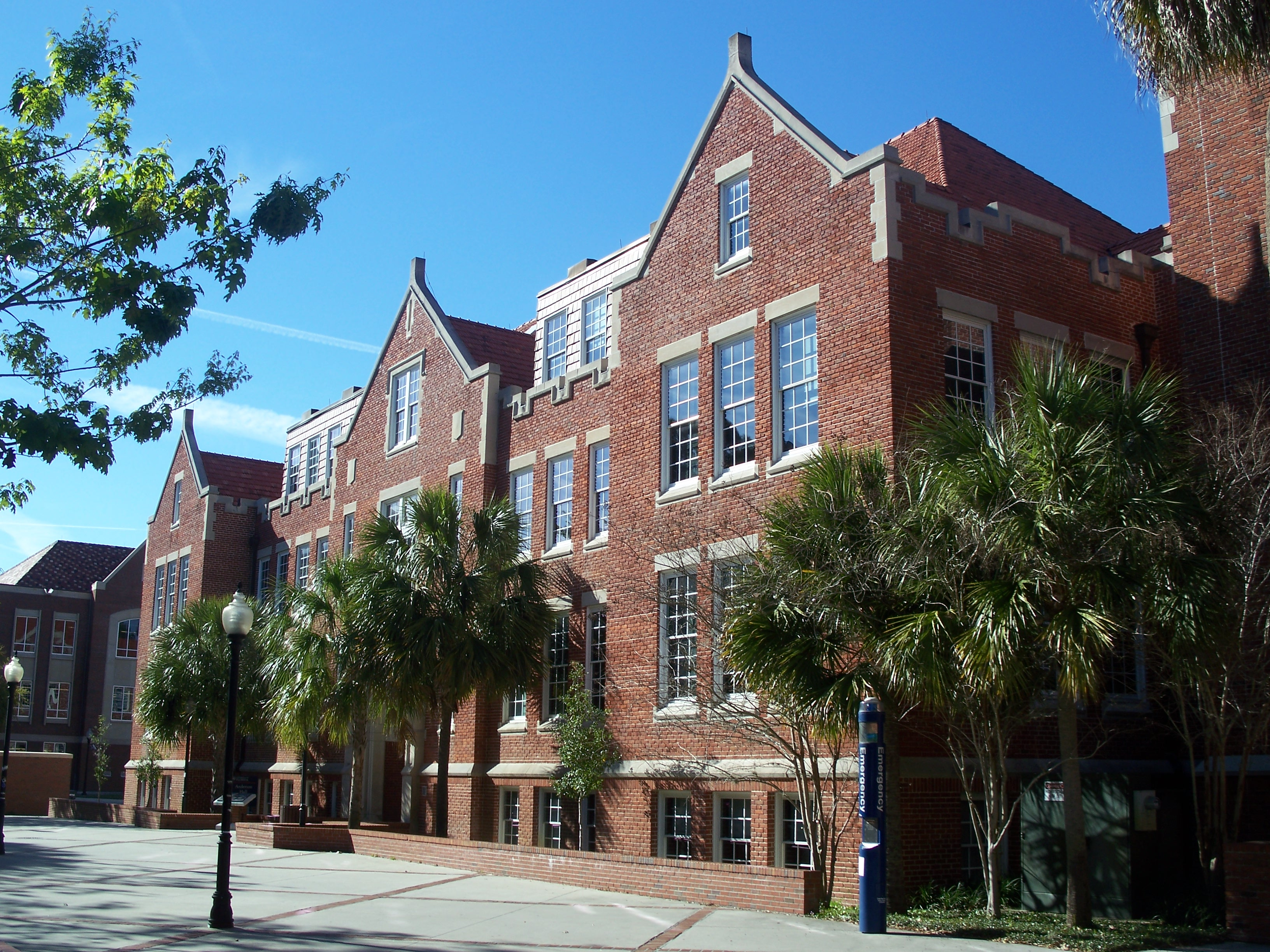
Anderson Hall

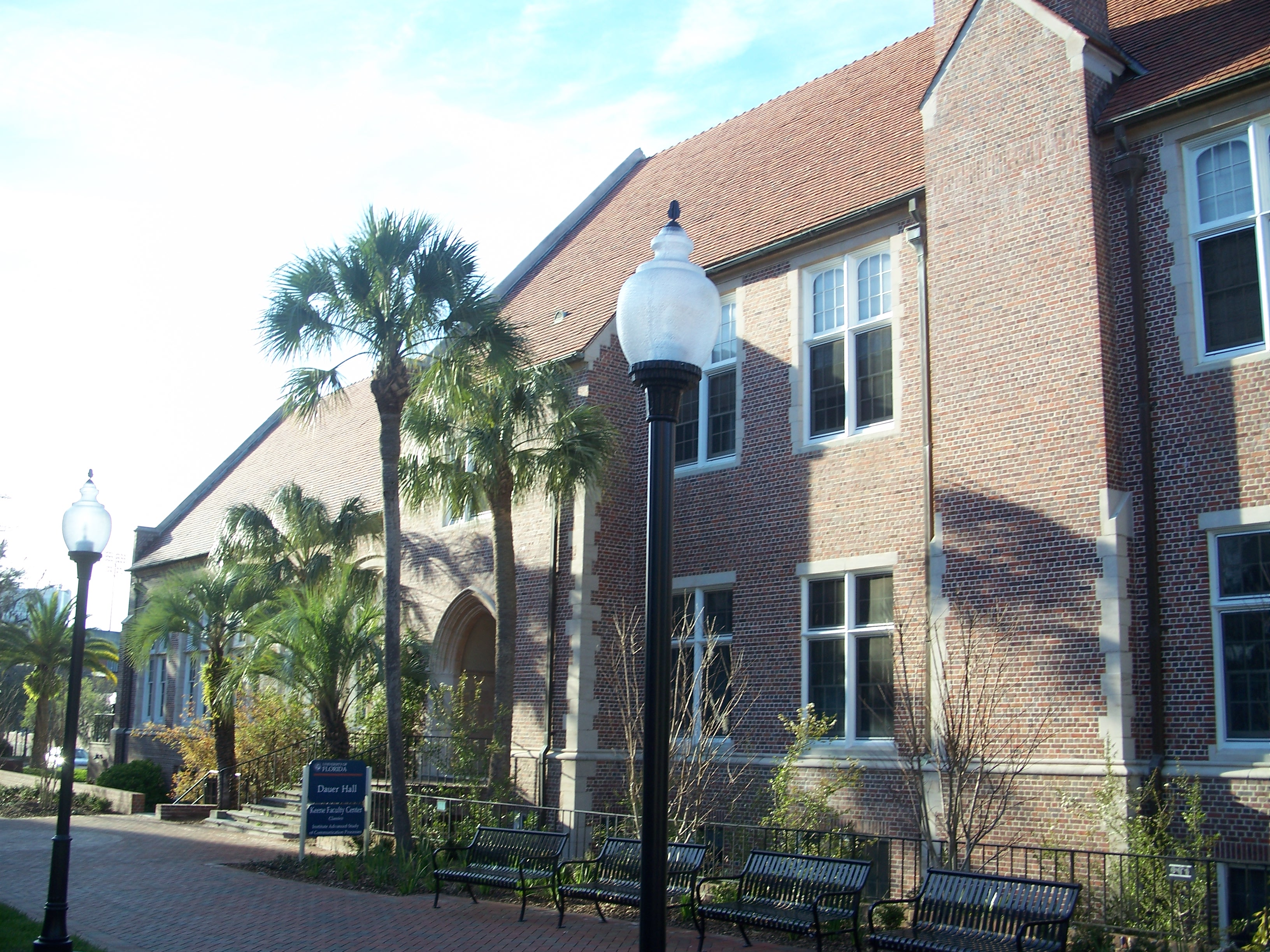
Dauer Hall

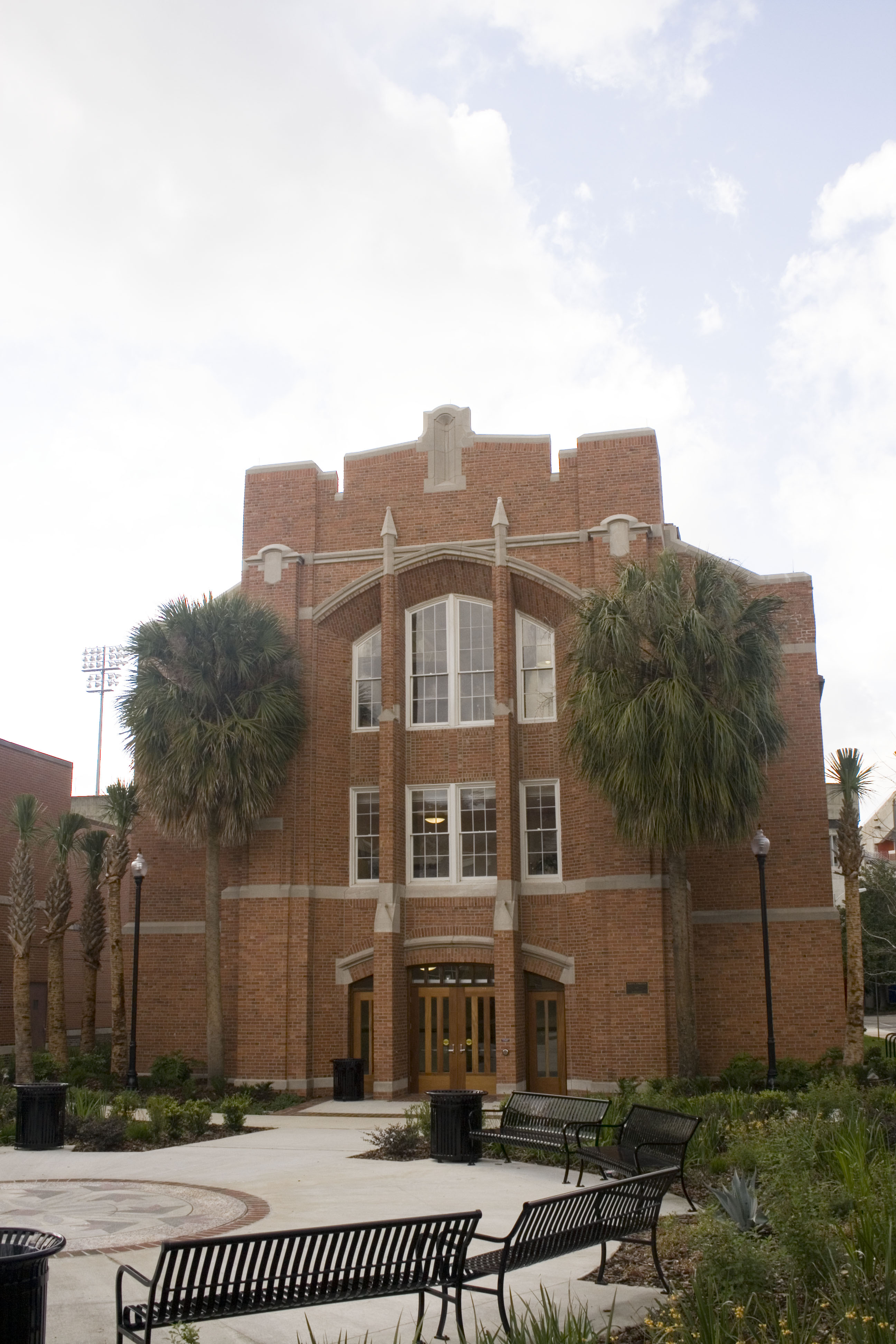
Ustler Hall

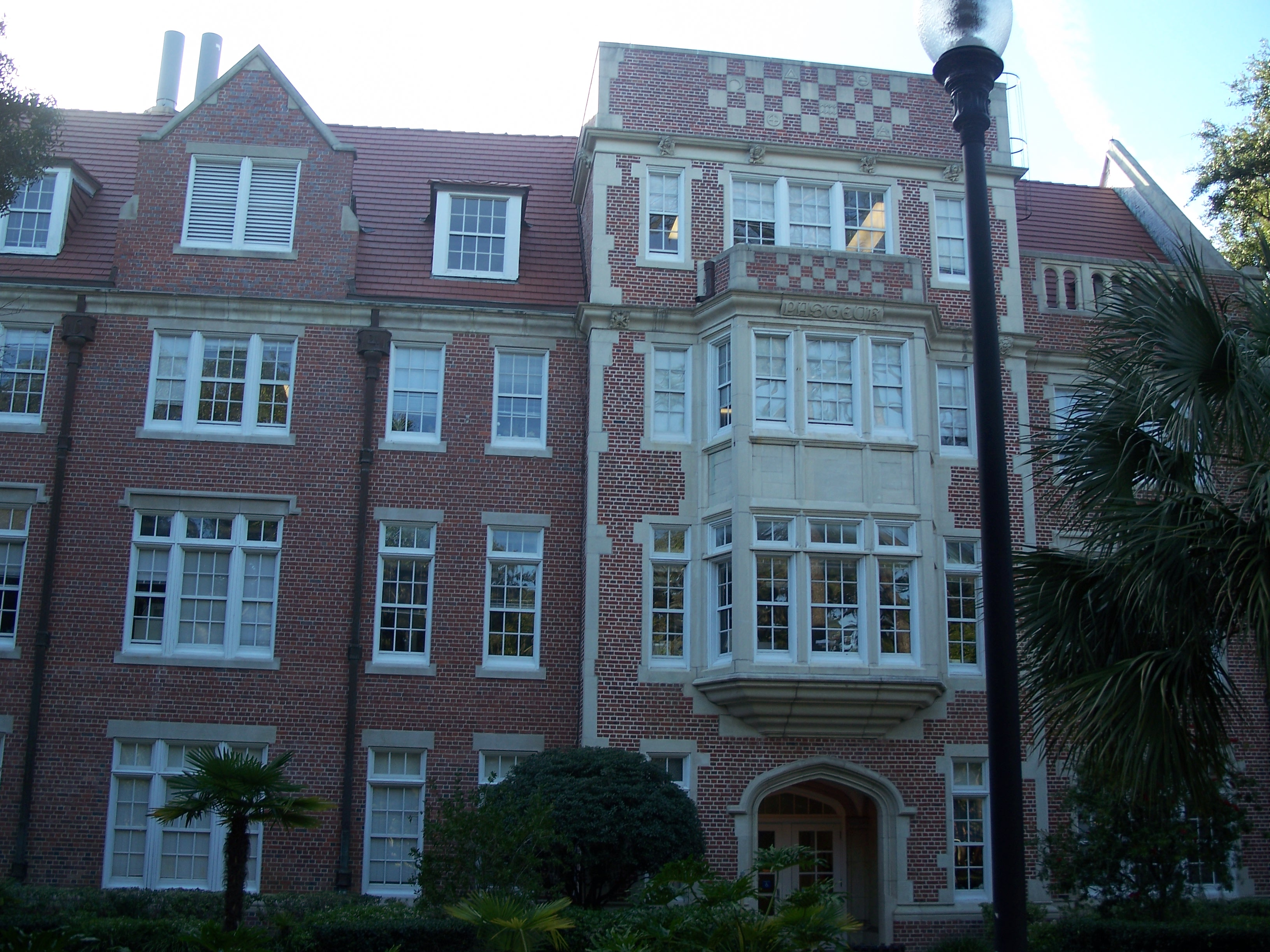
Leigh Hall

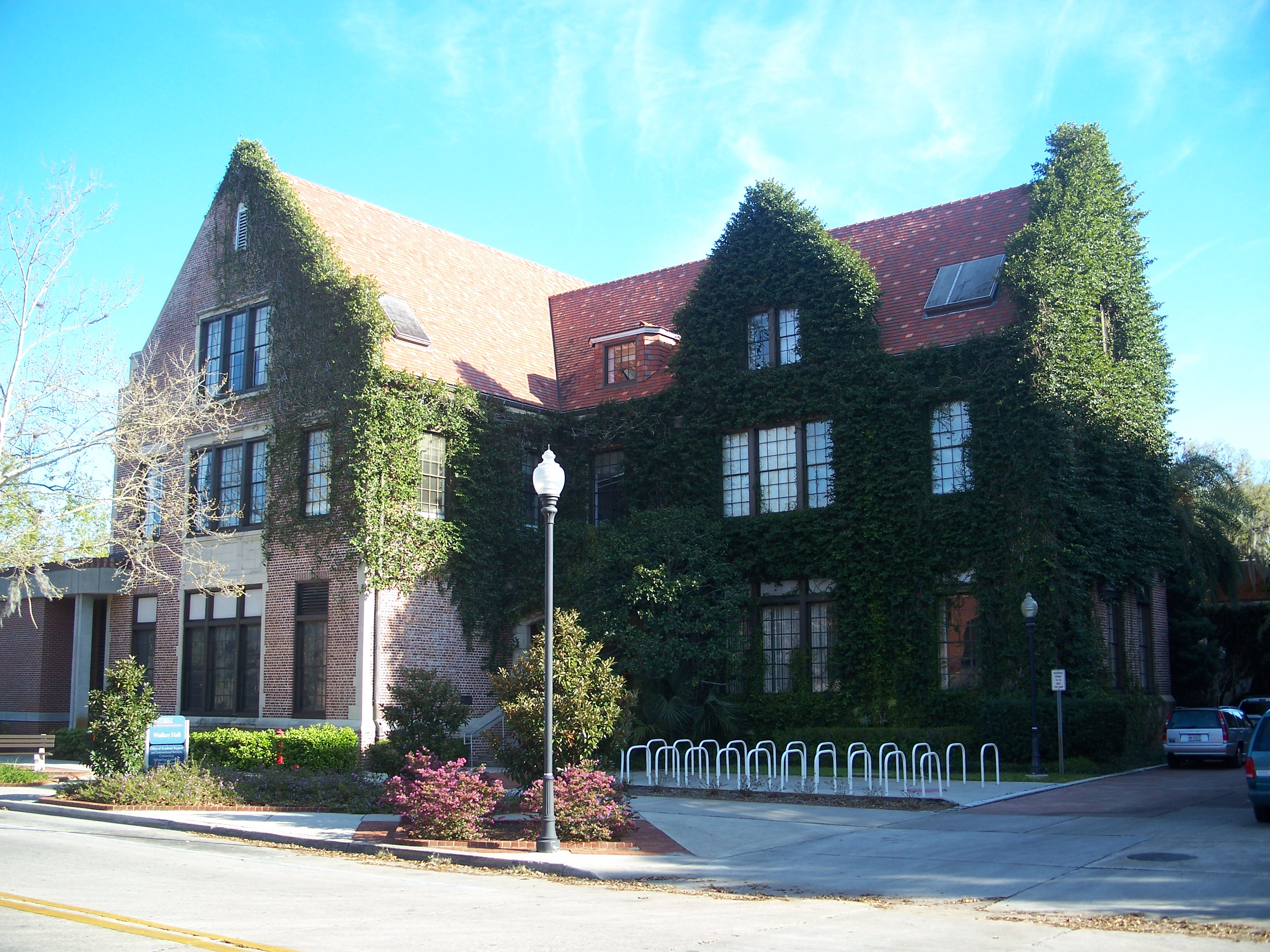
Walker Hall

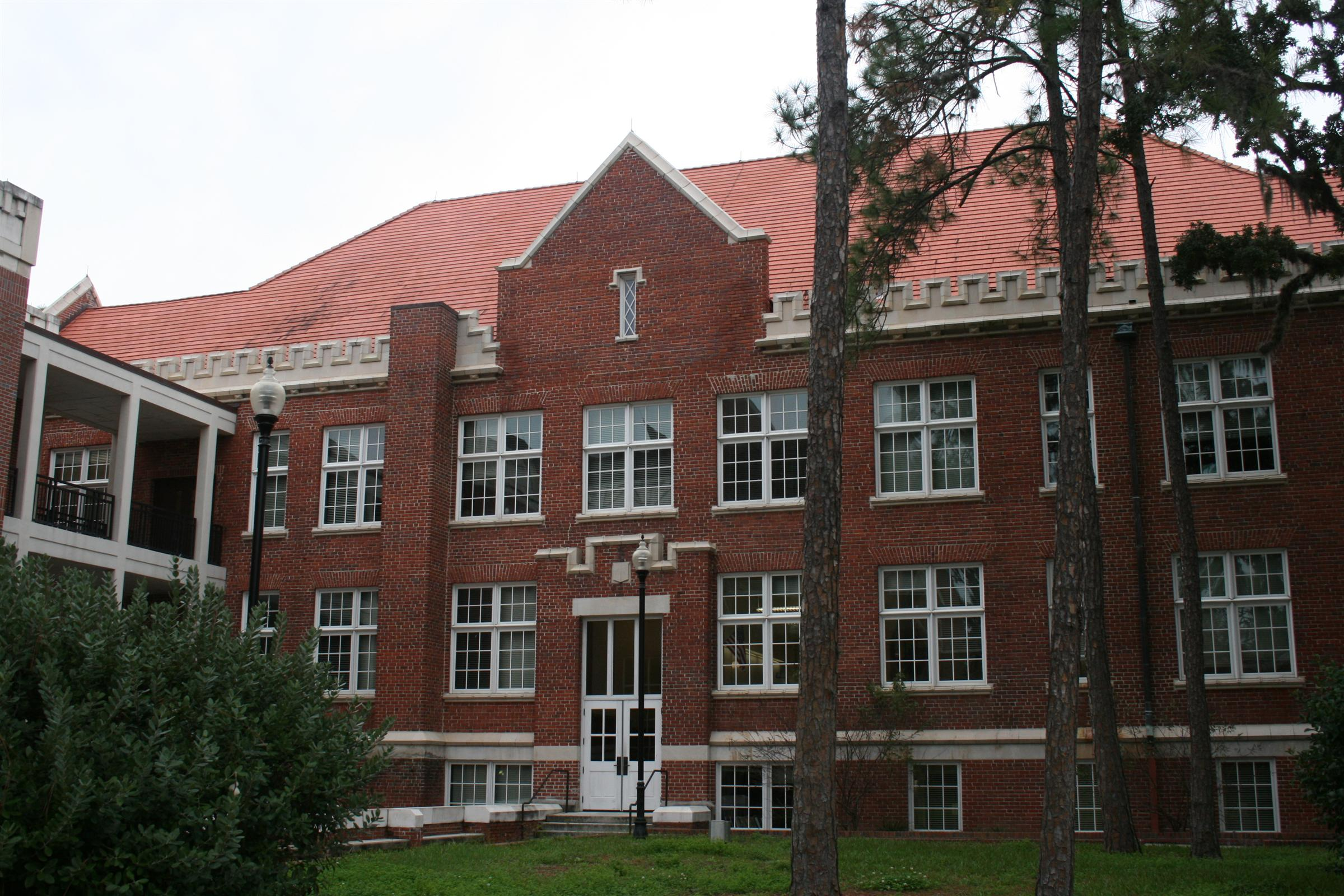
Flint Hall

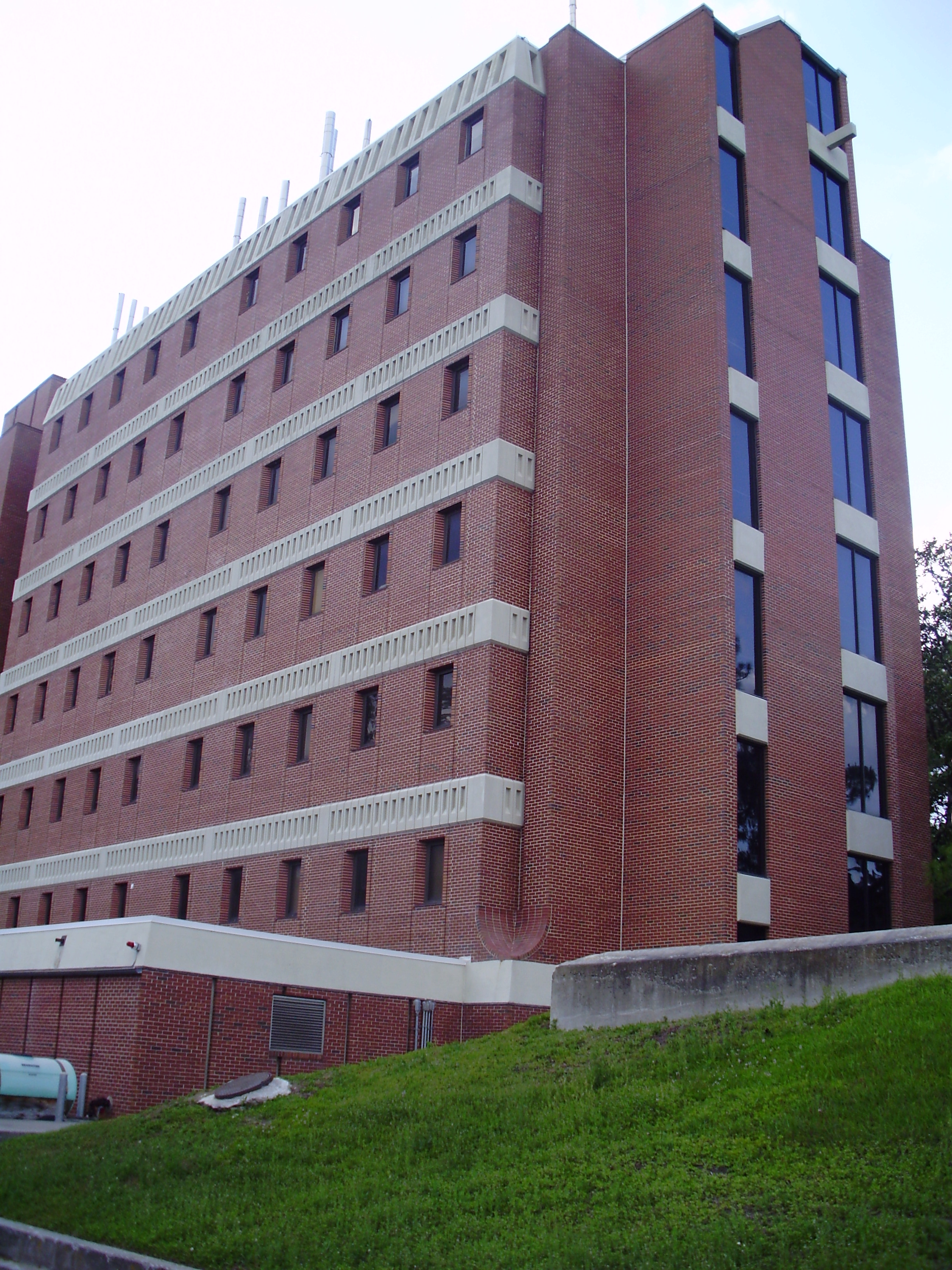
Bartram Hall

The College of Liberal Arts and Sciences (CLAS) is the college of arts and sciences of the University of Florida.

Most core curriculum classes, 43 majors, and 47 minors are part of the college. The university reports that more than 700 faculty members teach at least 35,000 students each year, with more than 11,000 undergraduates pursuing a degree from the college and 1,500 graduate students are also attaining graduate degrees in the college.

The college faculty have received a variety of national and international awards, including the Pulitzer Prize, Guggenheim Fellowships, Senior Fulbright Awards, National Science Foundation Fellowships, Presidential Young Investigator Awards and National Endowment for the Humanities Fellowships. They hold memberships in the National Academy of Sciences, the Nobel Prize Committee, the Swedish Royal Academy of Sciences and the Royal Societies of London and Edinburgh.

Liberal Arts and Sciences students have numerous scholarships and awards for their academic performance. During the past several years, CLAS students have been recognized as a Rhodes Scholar, Barry Goldwater Scholars, Harry Truman Scholars, and James Madison Scholars.

== National rankings according to US News (2020 edition) ==
Department	Ranking
Analytical Science	11th overall
Criminology	19th overall
Physics	37th overall
Psychology	39th overall
Statistics	40th overall
Chemistry	41st overall
Computer Science	49th overall
History	53rd overall
Earth Science	54th overall
Economics	55th overall
Sociology	57th overall
Political Science	61st overall
Mathematics	62nd overall
English	67th overall
Biological Sciences	73rd overall

== Departments ==
- Anthropology
- Astronomy
- Biology
- Chemistry
- Classics
- Geological Sciences
- English
- Geography
- History
- Languages, Literatures, and Cultures
- Linguistics
- Mathematics
- Philosophy
- Physics
- Political Science
- Psychology
- Religion
- Sociology and Criminology & Law
- Statistics

== Research Centers and Institutes ==
- Academic Advising
- African American Studies
- Bureau of Economic and Business Research
- UF Center for African Studies
- Bob Graham Center for Public Service
- Center for European Studies (CES)
- Center for Greek Studies
- Center for International Studies
- Center for the Study of Hindu Traditions (CHiTra)
- Center for Humanities and the Public Sphere
- Center for Jewish Studies
- France–Florida Research Institute
- Land Use and Environmental Change Institute (LUECI)
- Learning Resources (previously the Language Learning Center and the Teaching Center)
- Center for Gender, Sexualities, and Women's Studies Research
- Samuel Proctor Oral History Program
- University Writing Program
- William and Grace Dial Center for Written & Oral Communication
- Tea Literary & Arts Magazine

== Additional Programs and Centers ==
- Center for Applied Mathematics
- Center for Applied Optimization
- Center for Catalysis
- Center for Chemical Research at the Bio/Nano Interface
- Center for Chemical Physics
- Center for Children's Literature and Culture
- Center for Film Studies and Media Studies
- Center for Macromolecular Science and Engineering
- Center for Medieval and Early Modern Studies
- Institute for Fundamental Theory

== Deans of the College of Liberal Arts and Sciences ==
Years	Dean
1910–1934	James N. Anderson
1934–1947	Townes R. Leigh
1948–1971	Ralph E. Page
1972–1978	Calvin A. VanderWerf
1978–1988	Charles F. Sidman
1988–2000	Willard W. Harrison
2000–2007	Neil S. Sullivan
2007–2008	Joe Glover (interim)
2008–2014	Paul D'Anieri
2014–	Dave Richardson

== Research ==
The College of Liberal Arts and Sciences was awarded $43.9 million in annual research expenditures in sponsored research for 2024. Liberal Arts and Sciences researchers have been involved in groundbreaking research in a variety of disciplines. Their achievements include contributions of the algorithm and input optics for LIGO, which has detected several "chirps" of gravitational waves produced by colliding black holes. Other significant research includes Project Implicit, which studies implicit bias. The college includes experts on pressing topics such as climate change.

== Alumni ==
Notable alumni of the college include politicians Bob Graham, Debbie Wasserman Schultz, and Marco Rubio; former ambassador Dennis K. Hays, Kathy Fields, co-creator of Proactiv and Rodan + Fields skincare; Nobel Prize-winning chemist Robert Grubbs; award-winning authors Kate DiCamillo and James Grippando, and Pulitzer-winning journalist Dexter Filkins.

== See also ==
- University of Florida
- Subtropics Literary Magazine
