= Engelbert–Schmidt zero–one law =

Theorem in mathematics

The Engelbert–Schmidt zero–one law is a theorem that gives a mathematical criterion for an event associated with a continuous, non-decreasing additive functional of Brownian motion to have probability either 0 or 1, without the possibility of an intermediate value. This zero-one law is used in the study of questions of finiteness and asymptotic behavior for stochastic differential equations. (A Wiener process is a mathematical formalization of Brownian motion used in the statement of the theorem.) This 0-1 law, published in 1981, is named after Hans-Jürgen Engelbert and the probabilist Wolfgang Schmidt (not to be confused with the number theorist Wolfgang M. Schmidt).

== Engelbert–Schmidt 0–1 law ==
Let $\mathcal{F}$ be a σ-algebra and let $F = (\mathcal{F}_t)_{t \ge 0}$ be an increasing family of sub-σ-algebras of $\mathcal{F}$. Let $(W, F)$ be a Wiener process on the probability space $(\Omega, \mathcal{F}, P)$. Suppose that $f$ is a Borel measurable function of the real line into [0,∞]. Then the following three assertions are equivalent:

(i) $P \Big( \int_0^t f (W_s)\,\mathrm ds < \infty \text{ for all } t \ge 0 \Big) > 0$.

(ii) $P \Big( \int_0^t f (W_s)\,\mathrm ds < \infty \text{ for all } t \ge 0 \Big) = 1$.

(iii) $\int_K f (y)\,\mathrm dy < \infty \,$ for all compact subsets $K$ of the real line.

== Extension to stable processes ==
In 1997 Pio Andrea Zanzotto proved the following extension of the Engelbert–Schmidt zero-one law. It contains Engelbert and Schmidt's result as a special case, since the Wiener process is a real-valued stable process of index $\alpha = 2$.

Let $X$ be a $\mathbb R$-valued stable process of index $\alpha\in(1,2]$ on the filtered probability space $(\Omega, \mathcal{F}, (\mathcal{F}_t), P)$. Suppose that $f:\mathbb R \to [0,\infty]$ is a Borel measurable function. Then the following three assertions are equivalent:

(i) $P \Big( \int_0^t f (X_s)\,\mathrm ds < \infty \text{ for all } t \ge 0 \Big) > 0$.

(ii) $P \Big( \int_0^t f (X_s)\,\mathrm ds < \infty \text{ for all } t \ge 0 \Big) = 1$.

(iii) $\int_K f (y)\,\mathrm dy < \infty \,$ for all compact subsets $K$ of the real line.

The proof of Zanzotto's result is almost identical to that of the Engelbert–Schmidt zero-one law. The key object in the proof is the local time process associated with stable processes of index $\alpha\in(1,2]$, which is known to be jointly continuous.

== See also ==
- zero-one law
