= University of Florida Center for African Studies =

University of Florida department

- Type: Public
- Established: 1964
- Affiliations: University of Florida
- Director: Miles Larmer
- Academic staff: 100+
- Location: Gainesville, Florida, USA; 29°38′57.4″N 82°20′31.5″W
- Website: http://africa.ufl.edu/

University of Florida Center for African Studies (CAS) is a center within of the College of Liberal Arts and Sciences (CLAS) at the University of Florida (UF). The Center provides teaching and research into issues of African languages, humanities, social sciences, agriculture, business, engineering, education, fine arts, environmental studies, conservation, journalism, and law.

== Overview ==
The Center for African Studies currently offers undergraduate and postgraduate study programs in numerous Africa-related fields.

The Center for African Studies is in the College of Liberal Arts & Sciences at the University of Florida. In addition to undergraduate education, the Center promotes and supports graduate studies.

The Center has over 100 affiliated teaching and research faculty in a wide variety of fields, including: languages, the humanities, the social sciences, agriculture, business, engineering, education, fine arts, environmental studies and conservation, journalism, and law. A number of faculty members with appointments wholly or partially within the Center have facilitated the development of a core curriculum in African Studies in support of the undergraduate minor and graduate certificate programs.

A full-time Outreach Director oversees an active program that provides ongoing training opportunities for K-12 teachers and educators from postsecondary institutions as well as outreach for business, media, and community groups.

CAS is funded in part by the U.S. Department of Education Title VI National Resource Center program which supports research, teaching, outreach, and development of international linkages. It is the only National Resource Center for Africa located in the southeastern US, and the only one in a sub-tropical zone.

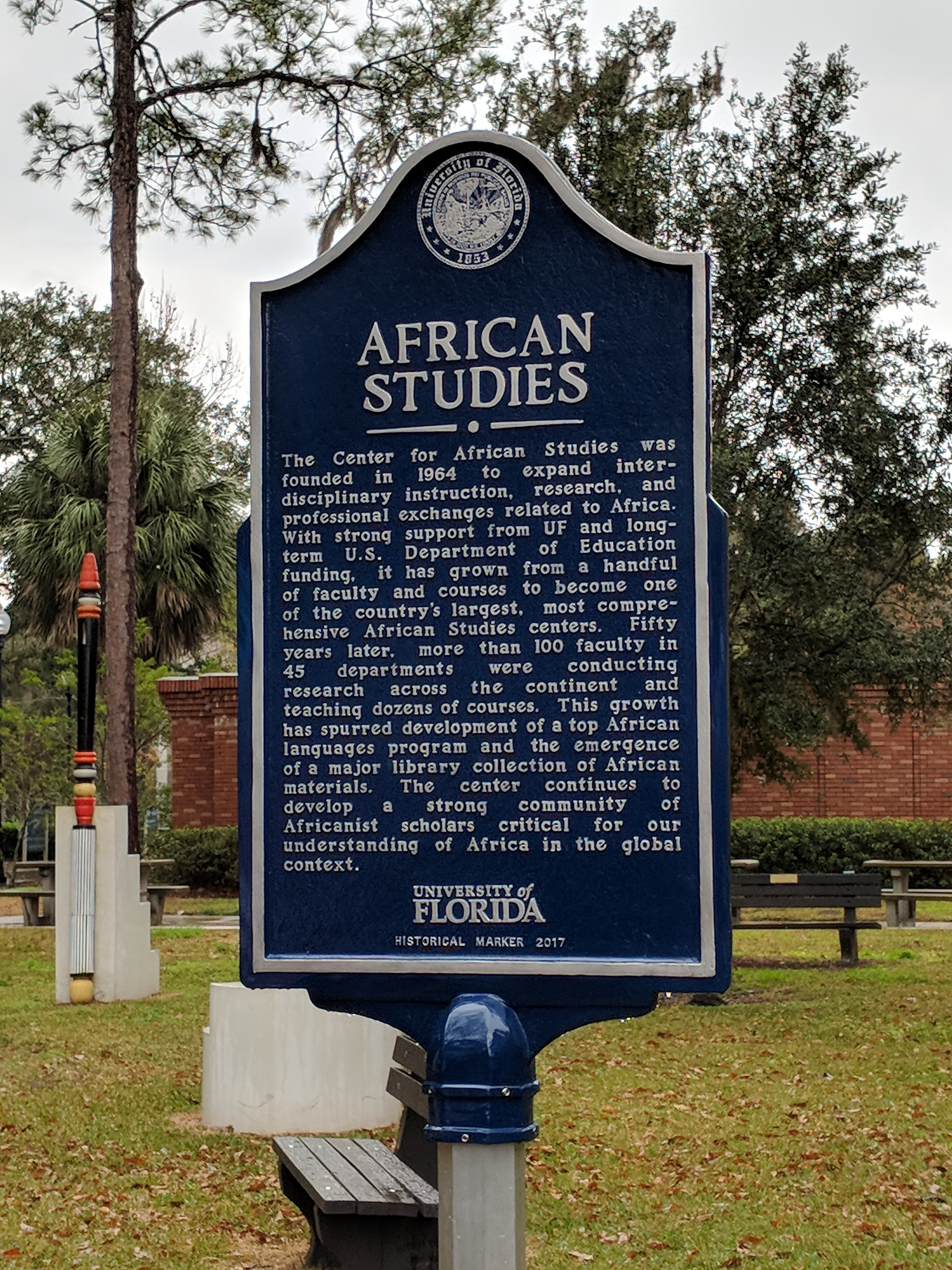
Center for African Studies Historical Marker on Grinter Lawn

== Program in African Languages ==
The Program in African Languages is one of the Center for African Studies’ central components.

Currently, the Center for African Studies offers language training in Akan, Amharic, Arabic, Swahili, Wolof, Xhosa, and Yoruba, although other languages have been offered in the past. The University of Florida is only the second university nationwide to offer an African languages major.

== African Studies Library Collection ==
The African Studies Collection at the University of Florida Libraries is recognized as a unique resource within the University of Florida's George A. Smathers libraries, ranking among the best such collections in the U.S. Its holdings include disciplinary topics from the natural sciences and applied fields such as agriculture and public health, to the social sciences, humanities, and professions. Reflecting the great breadth and depth of these academic and professional programs, the African Studies Collection facilitates interdisciplinary and applied approaches to the study of the continent, its flora and fauna, peoples and cultures, natural resources and wildlife for which UF's African Studies programs are best known. The African Studies Collection has a collaborative partnership with the UF Center for African Studies, which contributes generous funding for library materials and services through its U.S. Department of Education Title VI grant as a National Resource Center.

Some of the African Studies collections are available through the UF Digital Collections, accessible online. Sub-collections within the African Studies Library Digital Collection include The Arts of Africa = Les Arts d'Afrique, Photographs of Africa Collection, Wildlife Conservation, Jean Marie Derscheid, Onitsha Market Literature, George Fortune Collection, and Martin Rikli Photographs Collection.

Notable print holdings (from which many of the digital collections derive) include the George Fortune collection of Southern Bantu linguistics (especially Shona), the Donald Abraham collection of Lusophone culture and history (concentrating on Angola and Mozambique), Gwendolen M. Carter's materials relating to the South African liberation struggle, Bob Campbell's photographs of Dian Fossey and the Karisoke Research Center, and Martin Rikli's photographic albums of Ethiopia during the Italian invasion and occupation of 1935-1936.

For maps of Africa, see also the African Map Collection which offers maps dating from the 16th through the 21st centuries, including examples of work from the most important cartographers and representing some of the most important maps from the Age of Exploration to the present day.

== African Studies Quarterly ==
The Center for African Studies founded the African Studies Quarterly (ASQ) to promote research on Africa beyond that undertaken by University of Florida faculty and graduate students. It is an interdisciplinary, fully refereed, online open access journal.

== See also ==
- University of Florida
- College of Liberal Arts and Sciences at UF
