= Ronald Getoor =

American mathematician (1929–2017)

Ronald Kay Getoor
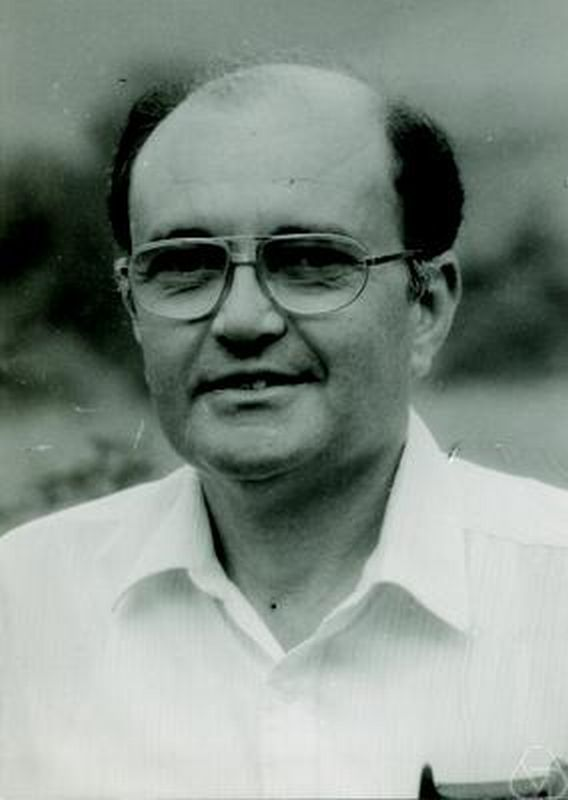
- Ronald Getoor, Oberwolfach 1984
- Born: Ronald Kay Getoor; 9 February 1929; Royal Oak, Michigan
- Died: October 28, 2017 (aged 88)
- Education: University of Michigan
- Known for: Blumenthal-Getoor index
- Scientific career
- Fields: Probability
- Workplaces: University of Washington; UC San Diego
- Thesis: Some Connections Between Operators in Hilbert Space and Random Functions of Second Order (1954)
- Doctoral advisor: Arthur Herbert Copeland
- Doctoral students: Philip Protter; Henryk Gzyl

Ronald Kay Getoor (9 February 1929, Royal Oak, Michigan – 28 October 2017, La Jolla, San Diego, California) was an American mathematician. Getoor received from the University of Michigan bachelor's degree in 1950, master's degree in 1951, and Ph.D. in 1954 under Arthur Herbert Copeland with thesis Connections between operators in Hilbert space and random functions of second order. As a postdoc he was an instructor at Princeton University. He became in 1956 an assistant professor and then full professor at the University of Washington. During the academic year 1964–1965 he was a visiting professor at Stanford University. From 1966 until his retirement in 2000 he was a professor at the University of California, San Diego.

Getoor's research deals with probability theory, especially the theory of Markov processes and potential theory. In 1970 he was an invited speaker at the International Congress of Mathematicians in Nice. He was elected a Fellow of the Institute of Mathematical Statistics and in 2012 a Fellow of the American Mathematical Society.

== Scientific work ==
In the late 1950s, Getoor and Robert Blumenthal set out to understand the work of Gilbert Hunt on the connection between Markov processes and potential theory, extending the connections between Brownian motion and Newtonian potential theory. Getoor's 1968 book Markov Processes and Potential Theory, co-authored with Blumenthal, became a reference on the topic.

Together with Blumenthal and Sharpe, Getoor obtained many results on the fine structure of Markov processes and martingales, in particular the theory of local time for Markov processes.

With Michael J. Sharpe, Getoor defined the notion of 'conformal martingale', which proved to be influential in potential theory, investigated the behavior of Bessel processes, last-exit times and excursions. Starting in the early 1980s, Getoor studied stationary extensions of a given strong Markov process, with time extending to infinity in both directions, formulating a pathwise view of "time reversal" which became a key tool in his studies of the excessive measures of a Markov process.

The 'Blumenthal-Getoor index', a concept which characterises the nature of discontinuities of Lévy processes and semi-martingales, is named after him.

== Personal life ==
He married in 1959. His wife Ann Getoor worked on the design of commercial aircraft at Boeing, and his daughter Lise Getoor is a professor of computer science at the University of California, Santa Cruz. Getoor died at home on October 28, 2017, in La Jolla at the age of 88.

== Selected publications ==
Books

- Markov processes: Ray processes and right processes. Lecture Notes in Mathematics 440. Springer Verlag. 1975. Getoor, R. K. (15 November 2006). 2006 reprint. Springer. ISBN 9783540374220; pbk, 124 pages
- with Robert McCallum Blumenthal: Markov Processes and Potential Theory. Academic Press. 1968.
- Excessive Measures. Birkhäuser. 1990. Getoor, R. K. (6 December 2012). 2012 reprint. Springer. ISBN 9781461234708; pbk, 190 pages

Articles

- Blumenthal, R. M.; Getoor, R. K. (1960). "Some theorems on stable processes". Trans. Amer. Math. Soc. 95 (2): 263–273. doi:10.1090/S0002-9947-1960-0119247-6.
- Blumenthal, R. M.; Getoor, R. K. (1961). "Sample functions of stochastic processes with stationary independent increments". Journal of Mathematics and Mechanics. 10 (3): 493–516. JSTOR 24900735.
- Blumenthal, R. M.; Getoor, R. K.; Ray, D. B. (1961). "On the distribution of first hits for the symmetric stable processes". Trans. Amer. Math. Soc. 99 (3): 540–554. doi:10.1090/S0002-9947-1961-0126885-4.
- Blumenthal, R. M.; Getoor, R. K. (1964). "Additive functionals of Markov processes in duality". Trans. Amer. Math. Soc. 112: 131–163. doi:10.1090/S0002-9947-1964-0160269-0.
- Blumenthal, R. M.; Getoor, R. K. (1964). "Local times for Markov processes". Zeitschrift für Wahrscheinlichkeitstheorie und Verwandte Gebiete. 3 (1): 50–74. doi:10.1007/BF00531683. S2CID 120071327.
- Getoor, R. K.; Sharpe, M. J. (1972). "Conformal martingales". Inventiones Mathematicae. 16 (4): 271–308. Bibcode:1972InMat..16..271G. doi:10.1007/BF01425714. S2CID 189830360.
