= Robert McCallum Blumenthal =

American mathematician (1931-2012)

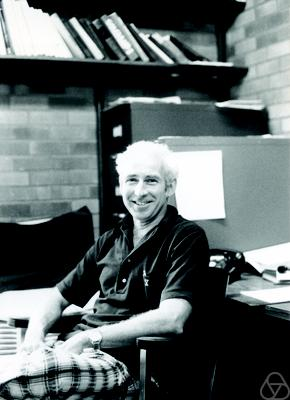
- Robert McCallum Blumenthal
- Born: 7 February 1931; Chicago, Illinois, U.S.
- Died: November 8, 2012 (aged 81)
- Education: Cornell University
- Known for: Blumenthal's zero-one law
- Scientific career
- Fields: Probability theory
- Workplaces: University of Washington
- Thesis: An Extended Markov Property (1956)
- Doctoral advisor: Gilbert Hunt
- Doctoral students: Chung-Tuo Shih

Robert "Bob" McCallum Blumenthal (7 February 1931, Chicago – 8 November 2012) was an American mathematician, specializing in probability theory. He is known for Blumenthal's zero-one law.

== Biography ==
He received his Ph.D. in mathematics from Cornell University in 1956 under Gilbert Hunt with thesis An Extended Markov Property.

At the time Hunt was in the process of developing the relationships between Markov processes and potential theory to be published in a monumental work in three installments in 1957 and 1958. This subject was to become one of the main topics of research in probability for the next 20–25 years. The class of processes for which Hunt developed his theory came to be called Hunt processes in later years. ... Already in his thesis Bob had established two of the basic principles of this topic: the strong Markov property (also established independently and more or less simultaneously by Dynkin and Yushkevich in the Soviet Union) and the quasi-left continuity of the sample paths of the process. In addition, his thesis contained what became known as the Blumenthal zero-one law.

Blumenthal became in 1956 an instructor at the University of Washington, was eventually promoted to full professor, and in 1997 retired there. He was on sabbatical for the academic year 1961–1962 at the Institute for Advanced Study in Princeton and for the academic year 1966–1967 in Germany.

Upon his death he was survived by his wife and two sons.

== Selected publications ==
=== Articles ===
- Blumenthal, R. M. (1959). "Some relationships involving subordination". Proc. Amer. Math. Soc. 10 (3): 502–510. doi:10.1090/S0002-9939-1959-0105744-3.
- with R. K. Getoor: Blumenthal, R. M.; Getoor, R. K. (1960). "Some theorems on stable processes". Trans. Amer. Math. Soc. 95 (2): 263–273. doi:10.1090/S0002-9947-1960-0119247-6.
- with R. K. Getoor: Blumenthal, R. M.; Getoor, R. K. (1961). "Sample functions of stochastic processes with stationary independent increments". Journal of Mathematics and Mechanics. 10 (3): 493–516. JSTOR 24900735.
- with R. K. Getoor and D. B. Ray: Blumenthal, R. M.; Getoor, R. K.; Ray, D. B. (1961). "On the distribution of first hits for the symmetric stable processes". Trans. Amer. Math. Soc. 99 (3): 540–554. doi:10.1090/S0002-9947-1961-0126885-4.
- with R. K. Getoor: Blumenthal, R. M.; Getoor, R. K. (1964). "Additive functionals of Markov processes in duality". Trans. Amer. Math. Soc. 112: 131–163. doi:10.1090/S0002-9947-1964-0160269-0.
- with R. K. Getoor: Blumenthal, R. M.; Getoor, R. K. (1964). "Local times for Markov processes". Zeitschrift für Wahrscheinlichkeitstheorie und Verwandte Gebiete. 3 (1): 50–74. doi:10.1007/BF00531683. S2CID 120071327.

=== Books ===
- with R. K. Getoor: Markov Processes and Potential Theory. 1968. Blumenthal, Robert Mccallum; Getoor, Ronald Kay (2007). Dover reprint. ISBN 9780486462639.
- Excursions of Markov Processes. 1992. Blumenthal, Robert M. (2012-12-06). 2012 reprint. ISBN 9781468494129; pbk, 276 pages
