= Zero–one law (logic) =

Animation showing that the probability that a graph has an isolated vertex goes to 0 when the size of the graph goes to infinity. The property "having an isolated vertex" is almost surely false.

In mathematical logic, zero-one law is a property of a logic saying that any property is either almost surely true or almost surely false. Zero-one law holds for first-order logic (without function symbols), first-order logic extended with fixed point operators and first-order with infinite disjunctions and conjunctions. It does not hold for monadic second order logic.

As pointed out by Yuri Gurevich, zero-one law was proven for first-order logic by Yu. V. Glebskii, D. I. Kogan, M. I. Liogon'kii & V. A. Talanov and independently by Ronald Fagin.

== Principle ==
In this article, to keep it simple, we talk about graphs instead of considering arbitrary structures. Given a sentence $\varphi$ in some logic, we define $\mu_n(\varphi)$ to be the proportion of graphs that satisfy $\varphi$ among the graphs with exactly $n$ vertices. We say that a logic has the zero-one law if $\mu_n(\varphi)$ converges to 1 or 0, for any sentence $\varphi$ of that logic. We set $\mu(\varphi)$ to be that limit to which $\mu_n(\varphi)$ converges when $n$ grows to infinity.

== Examples ==
We give the examples given in p. 236.

=== Even ===
Any logic in which "being of size even" is expressible by a formula $\varphi$ does not have the zero-one law. Indeed, $\mu_n(\varphi) = 1$ if $n$ is even and $\mu_n(\varphi) = 0$ if $n$ is odd. And the sequence $(1, 0, 1, 0, 1, 0, ...)$ does not converge.

=== Isolated vertex ===
Consider the first-order formula $\varphi$ that says that there is an isolated vertex: $\exists x \forall y \lnot E(x, y)$. We have $\mu_n(\varphi) \leq \frac{n \cdot 2^{\binom {n-1}2}}{2^{\binom n 2}} = \frac n {2^{n-1}}$

Indeed, first $2^{\binom {n}2}$is the total number of graphs with exactly $n$ vertices. Second, there are $n$ choices for the isolated vertex, and $2^{\binom {n-1}2}$ways to put edges on the remaining vertices. Thus, $n \cdot 2^{\binom {n-1}2}$is an upper bound on the number of graphs with $n$ vertices having an isolated vertex. Thus, $\mu(\varphi) = 0$.

== First-order logic ==
In this section, we consider first-order logic without function symbols. Note that with function symbols, zero-one law may fail. For instance, the formula $p(c)$where $c$ is a constant symbol (i.e. a function symbol of arity 0) would be true half of the times.

=== Statement ===
Theorem—First-order logic has the zero-one law: for all first-order formulas $\phi$, either $\mu(\varphi) = 0$ or $\mu(\varphi) = 1$.

First-order logic has the zero-one law. The main ingredients of the proof presented in (their proof is about first-order logic with infinite conjunctions and disjunctions but the idea is similar) are the following.

First we introduce so-called extension axioms. The extension axiom $EA_{n, m}$ says that for any two disjoint subsets $X$ and $Y$ of respective cardinality $n$ and $m$, there is a point $z$ connected to any points in $X$, but no points in $Y$. We show that $\mu(EA_{n, m}) = 1$.

Second, via pebble games, they prove that if two finite graphs satisfy all the extension axioms $EA_{n, m}$ with $n, m \leq k$, then they satisfy the same first-order formulas with at most $k$ variables.

=== Decidability ===
The Rado graph which is the model in which true formulas are exactly the formulas $\varphi$ such that $\mu(\varphi) = 1$

Theorem—It is decidable to know whether $\mu(\varphi) = 0$ or $\mu(\varphi) = 1$ for a given first-order formula $\phi$.

We can define the theory $\textbf{EA}$ of all extension axioms. This theory is $\omega$-categorial, meaning that it has only one countable model up to isomorphism. It turns out that model is the Rado graph. Thus, by Lowenheim-Skolem theorem, we can prove that $\textbf{EA}$ is complete, meaning that for any sentence $\varphi$, either $\varphi$ or $\lnot \varphi$ is entailed by $\textbf{EA}$. As $\textbf{EA}$ is recursive (we have an algorithm that tells whether a formula is an extension axiom or not), we can decide whether $\varphi$ or $\lnot \varphi$ is entailed by $\textbf{EA}$, which is equivalent to deciding whether $\mu(\varphi) = 1$ or $\mu(\varphi) = 0$. Moreover this problem has been shown to be PSPACE-complete.

== Other logics ==
The following logics have the zero-one law:

- First-order logic (as seen above)
- First-order logic $L^{\omega}_{\infty \omega}$ with infinite conjunctions and disjunctions (see Theorem 12.2 in)
- First-order logic with least fixed-point operators, first-order logic with inflationary fixed-point operators, with partial fixed-point operators (see Corollary 12.3 in)
- $\exists SO(\exists^*\forall^*)$ (see Theorem 12.12 in)
- $\exists SO(\exists^*\forall\exists^*)$ (see Theorem 12.15 in)
- First-order logic on grids

The following logics do not have the zero-one law:

- First-order logic with least fixed-point operators with a predicate < interpreted as a total order on the domain (see second paragraph after Corollary 12.3 in)
- $\exists SO(\forall\forall\exists)$ even if the FO part does not use equality (see Theorem 12.16 in)
- MSO (see Exercice 12.6 in)
- First-order logic with unary function symbols does not have the zero-one law, but has the convergence law, meaning that for all formulas $\varphi$, the quantity $\mu_n(\varphi)$ converges.
