= Gilbert Hunt =

American tennis player and mathematician (1916-2008)

- Full name: Gilbert A. Hunt, Jr.
- Country (sports): United States
- Born: March 4, 1916 Washington, D.C.
- Died: May 30, 2008 (aged 92) Princeton, New Jersey
- Plays: Right-handed (one-handed backhand)

Singles
- Career record: 89-52
- Career titles: 6

Grand Slam singles results
- US Open: QF (1938, 1939)

Gilbert Agnew Hunt, Jr. (March 4, 1916 – May 30, 2008) was an American mathematician and amateur tennis player active in the 1930s and 1940s.

== Early life and education ==
Hunt was born in Washington, D.C. and attended Eastern High School.

== Tennis career ==
Hunt reached the quarterfinals of the U.S. National Championships in 1938 and 1939.

== Scientific career ==
Hunt received his bachelor's degree from George Washington University in 1938 and his Ph.D. from Princeton University in 1948 under Salomon Bochner. Hunt became a mathematics professor at Princeton University specializing in probability theory, Markov processes, and potential theory.

The Hunt process is named after him. He was an Invited Speaker at the ICM in 1962 in Stockholm. His doctoral students include Robert McCallum Blumenthal and Richard M. Dudley.

=== Hunt's theorem ===
Hunt's theorem states that for a large class of positive kernels $V$ satisfying "the complete maximum principle" of potential theory, there corresponds a contraction resolvent and associated sub-Markovian semigroup $P_t$ with

$V f= \int_0^\infty P_t f dt~.$ ($V$ is called the "potential kernel" of the semigroup.)

== Selected publications ==
- Hunt, G. A. (1951). "Random Fourier transforms". Trans. Amer. Math. Soc. 71: 38–69. doi:10.1090/S0002-9947-1951-0051340-3.
- with Paul Erdős: Erdős, Paul; Hunt, Gilbert (1953). "Changes of sign of sums of random variables". Pacific Journal of Mathematics. 3 (4): 673–687. doi:10.2140/pjm.1953.3.673.
- Hunt, G. A. (1954). "On positive Green's functions". Proc. Natl. Acad. Sci. 40 (9): 816–818. Bibcode:1954PNAS...40..816H. doi:10.1073/pnas.40.9.816. PMC 534174. PMID 16589567.
- Hunt, G. A. (1955). "An inequality in probability theory". Proc. Amer. Math. Soc. 6 (3): 506–510. doi:10.1090/S0002-9939-1955-0075470-4.
- Hunt, G. A. (1956). "Markoff processes and potentials". Proc. Natl. Acad. Sci. 42 (7): 414–418. Bibcode:1956PNAS...42..414H. doi:10.1073/pnas.42.7.414. PMC 534239. PMID 16589879.
- Hunt, G. A. (1956). "Semi-groups of measures on Lie groups". Trans. Amer. Math. Soc. 81 (2): 264–293. doi:10.1090/S0002-9947-1956-0079232-9.
- Hunt, G. A. (1956). "Some theorems concerning Brownian motion". Trans. Amer. Math. Soc. 81 (2): 294–319. doi:10.1090/S0002-9947-1956-0079377-3.
- Hunt, G. A. (1956). "A theorem of Elie Cartan". Proc. Amer. Math. Soc. 7 (2): 307–308. doi:10.1090/S0002-9939-1956-0077075-9.
