= Janie Fouke =

American Engineer

Academic background
- Education: University of North Carolina at Chapel Hill
- Thesis: Response of tracheal smooth muscle to acetylcholine following ozone exposure in dogs (1982)

Janie McLawhorn Fouke is an American biomedical engineer known for her work in airway physiology and academic leadership.

== Education and career ==
Fouke completed her undergraduate education at St. Andrews Presbyterian College in 1973, and then taught in a public school in Scotland County, North Carolina for the next two years. She went on to receive an M.S. (1980) and a Ph.D. (1982) from the University of North Carolina.

From 1981 to 1995, she taught at Case Western Reserve University. From 1995 to 1999, she worked at the National Science Foundation, and from 1999 to 2005, she was dean at Michigan State University. In 2005, she worked at the University of Florida where she was the provost. In 2011 she was named head of the engineering school at Nanyang Technological University.

== Honors and awards ==
Fouke was elected a fellow of the American Association for the Advancement of Science in 1991. In 1995 she was named a fellow of the American Institute for Medical and Biological Engineering. In 2012 she was named a fellow of the American Society for Engineering Education. She was also named a fellow of the Biomedical Engineering Society.
