= Borel right process =

In the mathematical theory of probability, a Borel right process, named after Émile Borel, is a particular kind of continuous-time random process.

Let $E$ be a locally compact, separable, metric space. We denote by $\mathcal E$ the Borel subsets of $E$. Let $\Omega$ be the space of right continuous maps from $[0,\infty)$ to $E$ that have left limits in $E$, and for each $t \in [0,\infty)$, denote by $X_t$ the coordinate map at $t$; for each $\omega \in \Omega$, $X_t(\omega) \in E$ is the value of $\omega$ at $t$. We denote the universal completion of $\mathcal E$ by $\mathcal E^*$. For each $t\in[0,\infty)$, let

$$\mathcal F_t  = \sigma\left\{ X_s^{-1}(B) : s\in[0,t], B \in \mathcal E\right\},$$

$$\mathcal F_t^*  = \sigma\left\{ X_s^{-1}(B) : s\in[0,t], B \in \mathcal E^*\right\},$$

and then, let

$$\mathcal F_\infty  = \sigma\left\{ X_s^{-1}(B) : s\in[0,\infty), B \in \mathcal E\right\},$$

$$\mathcal F_\infty^*  = \sigma\left\{ X_s^{-1}(B) : s\in[0,\infty), B \in \mathcal E^*\right\}.$$

For each Borel measurable function $f$ on $E$, define, for each $x \in E$,

$$U^\alpha f(x) = \mathbf E^x\left[ \int_0^\infty e^{-\alpha t} f(X_t)\, dt \right].$$

Since $P_tf(x) = \mathbf E^x\left[f(X_t)\right]$ and the mapping given by $t \rightarrow X_t$ is right continuous, we see that for any uniformly continuous function $f$, we have the mapping given by $t \rightarrow P_tf(x)$ is right continuous.

Therefore, together with the monotone class theorem, for any universally measurable function $f$, the mapping given by $(t,x) \rightarrow P_tf(x)$, is jointly measurable, that is, $\mathcal B([0,\infty))\otimes \mathcal E^*$ measurable, and subsequently, the mapping is also $\left(\mathcal B([0,\infty))\otimes \mathcal E^*\right)^{\lambda\otimes \mu}$-measurable for all finite measures $\lambda$ on $\mathcal B([0,\infty))$ and $\mu$ on $\mathcal E^*$. Here, $\left(\mathcal B([0,\infty))\otimes \mathcal E^*\right)^{\lambda\otimes \mu}$ is the completion of $\mathcal B([0,\infty))\otimes \mathcal E^*$ with respect to the product measure $\lambda \otimes \mu$. Thus, for any bounded universally measurable function $f$ on $E$, the mapping $t\rightarrow P_tf(x)$ is Lebesgue measurable, and hence, for each $\alpha \in [0,\infty)$, one can define

$$U^\alpha f(x) = \int_0^\infty e^{-\alpha t}P_tf(x) dt.$$

There is enough joint measurability to check that $\{U^\alpha : \alpha \in (0,\infty) \}$ is a Markov resolvent on $(E,\mathcal E^*)$, which uniquely associated with the Markovian semigroup $\{ P_t : t \in [0,\infty) \}$. Consequently, one may apply Fubini's theorem to see that

$$U^\alpha f(x) = \mathbf E^x\left[ \int_0^\infty e^{-\alpha t} f(X_t) dt \right].$$

The following are the defining properties of Borel right processes:

- Hypothesis Droite 1:

For each probability measure $\mu$ on $(E, \mathcal E)$, there exists a probability measure $\mathbf P^\mu$ on $(\Omega, \mathcal F^*)$ such that $(X_t, \mathcal F_t^*, P^\mu)$ is a Markov process with initial measure $\mu$ and transition semigroup $\{ P_t : t \in [0,\infty) \}$.

- Hypothesis Droite 2:

Let $f$ be $\alpha$-excessive for the resolvent on $(E, \mathcal E^*)$. Then, for each probability measure $\mu$ on $(E,\mathcal E)$, a mapping given by $t \rightarrow f(X_t)$ is $P^\mu$ almost surely right continuous on $[0,\infty)$.
