= Invariant sigma-algebra =

Sigma-algebra used in probability and ergodic theory

In mathematics, especially in probability theory and ergodic theory, the invariant sigma-algebra is a sigma-algebra formed by sets which are invariant under a group action or dynamical system. It can be interpreted as of being "indifferent" to the dynamics.

The invariant sigma-algebra appears in the study of ergodic systems, as well as in theorems of probability theory such as de Finetti's theorem and the Hewitt-Savage law.

== Definition ==
=== Strictly invariant sets ===
Let $(X,\mathcal{F})$ be a measurable space, and let $T:(X,\mathcal{F})\to(X,\mathcal{F})$ be a measurable function. A measurable subset $S\in \mathcal{F}$ is called invariant if and only if $T^{-1}(S)=S$. Equivalently, if for every $x\in X$, we have that $x\in S$ if and only if $T(x)\in S$.

More generally, let $M$ be a group or a monoid, let $\alpha:M\times X\to X$ be a monoid action, and denote the action of $m\in M$ on $X$ by $\alpha_m:X\to X$. A subset $S\subseteq X$ is $\alpha$-invariant if for every $m\in M$, $\alpha_m^{-1}(S) = S$.

=== Almost surely invariant sets ===
Let $(X,\mathcal{F})$ be a measurable space, and let $T:(X,\mathcal{F})\to(X,\mathcal{F})$ be a measurable function. A measurable subset (event) $S\in \mathcal{F}$ is called almost surely invariant if and only if its indicator function $1_S$ is almost surely equal to the indicator function $1_{T^{-1}(S)}$.

Similarly, given a measure-preserving Markov kernel $k:(X,\mathcal{F},p)\to(X,\mathcal{F},p)$, we call an event $S\in\mathcal{F}$ almost surely invariant if and only if $k(S\mid x) = 1_S(x)$ for almost all $x\in X$.

As for the case of strictly invariant sets, the definition can be extended to an arbitrary group or monoid action.

In many cases, almost surely invariant sets differ by invariant sets only by a null set (see below).

=== Sigma-algebra structure ===
Both strictly invariant sets and almost surely invariant sets are closed under taking countable unions and complements, and hence they form sigma-algebras. These sigma-algebras are usually called either the invariant sigma-algebra or the sigma-algebra of invariant events, both in the strict case and in the almost sure case, depending on the author. For the purpose of the article, let's denote by $\mathcal{I}$ the sigma-algebra of strictly invariant sets, and by $\tilde{\mathcal{I}}$ the sigma-algebra of almost surely invariant sets.

== Properties ==
- Given a measure-preserving function $T:(X,\mathcal{A},p)\to (X,\mathcal{A},p)$, a set $A\in\mathcal{A}$ is almost surely invariant if and only if there exists a strictly invariant set $A'\in\mathcal{I}$ such that $p(A\triangle A')=0$.
- Given measurable functions $T:(X,\mathcal{A})\to (X,\mathcal{A})$ and $f:(X,\mathcal{A})\to(\mathbb{R},\mathcal{B})$, we have that $f$ is invariant, meaning that $f\circ T=f$, if and only if it is $\mathcal{I}$-measurable. The same is true replacing $(\mathbb{R},\mathcal{B})$ with any measurable space where the sigma-algebra separates points.
- An invariant measure $p$ is (by definition) ergodic if and only if for every invariant subset $A\in\mathcal{I}$, $p(A)=0$ or $p(A)=1$.

== Examples ==
=== Exchangeable sigma-algebra ===
Given a measurable space $(X,\mathcal{A})$, denote by $(X^\mathbb{N},\mathcal{A}^{\otimes\mathbb{N}})$ be the countable cartesian power of $X$, equipped with the product sigma-algebra. We can view $X^\mathbb{N}$ as the space of infinite sequences of elements of $X$,

$$X^\mathbb{N} = \{(x_0,x_1,x_2,\dots), x_i\in X\}.$$

Consider now the group $S_\infty$ of finite permutations of $\mathbb{N}$, i.e. bijections $\sigma:\mathbb{N}\to\mathbb{N}$ such that $\sigma(n)\ne n$ only for finitely many $n\in\mathbb{N}$. Each finite permutation $\sigma$ acts measurably on $X^\mathbb{N}$ by permuting the components, and so we have an action of the countable group $S_\infty$ on $X^\mathbb{N}$.

An invariant event for this sigma-algebra is often called an exchangeable event or symmetric event, and the sigma-algebra of invariant events is often called the exchangeable sigma-algebra. A random variable on $X^\mathbb{N}$ is exchangeable (i.e. permutation-invariant) if and only if it is measurable for the exchangeable sigma-algebra.

The exchangeable sigma-algebra plays a role in the Hewitt-Savage zero-one law, which can be equivalently stated by saying that for every probability measure $p$ on $(X,\mathcal{A})$, the product measure $p^{\otimes\mathbb{N}}$ on $X^\mathbb{N}$ assigns to each exchangeable event probability either zero or one. Equivalently, for the measure $p^{\otimes\mathbb{N}}$, every exchangeable random variable on $X^\mathbb{N}$ is almost surely constant.

It also plays a role in the de Finetti theorem.

=== Shift-invariant sigma-algebra ===
As in the example above, given a measurable space $(X,\mathcal{A})$, consider the countably infinite cartesian product $(X^\mathbb{N},\mathcal{A}^{\otimes\mathbb{N}})$. Consider now the shift map $T:X^\mathbb{N}\to X^\mathbb{N}$ given by mapping $(x_0,x_1,x_2,\dots)\in X^\mathbb{N}$ to $(x_1,x_2,x_3,\dots)\in X^\mathbb{N}$. An invariant event for this sigma-algebra is called a shift-invariant event, and the resulting sigma-algebra is sometimes called the shift-invariant sigma-algebra.

This sigma-algebra is related to the one of tail events, which is given by the following intersection,

$$\bigcap_{n\in\mathbb{N}} \left( \bigotimes_{m\ge n} \mathcal{A}_m \right),$$

where $\mathcal{A}_m\subseteq \mathcal{A}^{\otimes\mathbb{N}}$ is the sigma-algebra induced on $X^\mathbb{N}$ by the projection on the $m$-th component $\pi_m:(X^\mathbb{N},\mathcal{A}^{\otimes\mathbb{N}})\to(X,\mathcal{A})$.

Every shift-invariant event is a tail event, but the converse is not true.

== See also ==
- Invariant set
- De Finetti theorem
- Hewitt-Savage zero-one law
- Exchangeable random variables
- Invariant measure
- Ergodic system
