= De Finetti =

de Finetti usually refers to the Italian statistician Bruno de Finetti, noted for the "operational subjective" conception of probability. His works include:

- de Finetti's theorem, which explains why exchangeable observations are conditionally independent given some (usually) unobservable quantity
- de Finetti diagram, used to graph the genotype frequencies of populations
