= Monoidal =

Monoidal may refer to:

- Monoidal category, concept in category theory
  - Monoidal functor, between monoidal categories
  - Monoidal natural transformation, between monoidal functors
- Monoidal transformation, in algebraic geometry

== See also ==
- Monoid, an algebraic structure
- Monoid (category theory)
