= Chapman–Kolmogorov equation =

Equation from probability theory

In mathematics, specifically in the theory of Markovian stochastic processes in probability theory, the Chapman–Kolmogorov equation (CKE) is an identity relating the joint probability distributions of different sets of coordinates on a stochastic process. The equation was derived independently by both the British mathematician Sydney Chapman and the Russian mathematician Andrey Kolmogorov. The CKE is prominently used in recent variational Bayesian methods.

== Mathematical description ==
Suppose that { f_{i} } is an indexed collection of random variables, that is, a stochastic process. Let

$$p_{i_1,\ldots,i_n}(f_1,\ldots,f_n)$$

be the joint probability density function of the values of the random variables f_{1} to f_{n}. Then, the Chapman–Kolmogorov equation is

$$p_{i_1,\ldots,i_{n-1}}(f_1,\ldots,f_{n-1})=\int_{-\infty}^{\infty}p_{i_1,\ldots,i_n}(f_1,\ldots,f_n)\,df_n$$

i.e. a straightforward marginalization over the nuisance variable.

(Note that nothing yet has been assumed about the temporal (or any other) ordering of the random variables—the above equation applies equally to the marginalization of any of them.)

=== In terms of Markov kernels ===
If we consider the Markov kernels induced by the transitions of a Markov process, the Chapman-Kolmogorov equation can be seen as giving a way of composing the kernel, generalizing the way stochastic matrices compose. Given a measurable space $(X,\mathcal{A})$ and a Markov kernel $k:(X,\mathcal{A})\to(X,\mathcal{A})$, the two-step transition kernel $k^2:(X,\mathcal{A})\to(X,\mathcal{A})$ is given by

$$k^2(A|x) = \int_X k(A|x') \, k(dx'|x)$$

for all $x\in X$ and $A\in\mathcal{A}$. One can interpret this as a sum, over all intermediate states, of pairs of independent probabilistic transitions.

More generally, given measurable spaces $(X,\mathcal{A})$, $(Y,\mathcal{B})$ and $(Z,\mathcal{C})$, and Markov kernels $k:(X,\mathcal{A})\to(Y,\mathcal{B})$ and $h:(Y,\mathcal{B})\to(Z,\mathcal{C})$, we get a composite kernel $h\circ k:(X,\mathcal{A})\to(Z,\mathcal{C})$ by

$$(h\circ k)(C|x) = \int_Y h(C|y)\,k(dy|x)$$

for all $x\in X$ and $C\in\mathcal{C}$.

Because of this, Markov kernels, like stochastic matrices, form a category.

== Application to time-dilated Markov chains ==
When the stochastic process under consideration is Markovian, the Chapman–Kolmogorov equation is equivalent to an identity on transition densities. In the Markov chain setting, one assumes that i_{1} < ... < i_{n}. Then, because of the Markov property,

$$p_{i_1,\ldots,i_n}(f_1,\ldots,f_n)=p_{i_1}(f_1)p_{i_2;i_1}(f_2\mid f_1)\cdots p_{i_n;i_{n-1}}(f_n\mid
f_{n-1}),$$

where the conditional probability $p_{i;j}(f_i\mid f_j)$ is the transition probability between the times $i>j$. So, the Chapman–Kolmogorov equation takes the form

$$p_{i_3;i_1}(f_3\mid f_1)=\int_{-\infty}^\infty p_{i_3;i_2}(f_3\mid f_2)p_{i_2;i_1}(f_2\mid f_1) \, df_2.$$

Informally, this says that the probability of going from state 1 to state 3 can be found from the probabilities of going from 1 to an intermediate state 2 and then from 2 to 3, by adding up over all the possible intermediate states 2.

When the probability distribution on the state space of a Markov chain is discrete and the Markov chain is homogeneous, the Chapman–Kolmogorov equations can be expressed in terms of (possibly infinite-dimensional) matrix multiplication, thus:

$$P(t+s)=P(t)P(s)\,$$

where P(t) is the transition matrix of jump t, i.e., P(t) is the matrix such that entry (i,j) contains the probability of the chain moving from state i to state j in t steps.

As a corollary, it follows that to calculate the transition matrix of jump t, it is sufficient to raise the transition matrix of jump one to the power of t, that is

$$P(t)=P^t.\,$$

== Chapman-Kolmogorov in differential form ==
The differential form of the Chapman–Kolmogorov equation is a representation of the master equation associated with a time-continuous Markov process on a continuous state space. It is obtained under the assumption that the transition dynamics can be decomposed into:

- continuous transitions, corresponding to infinitesimal state increments $|x-x'|\ll 1$;
- discontinuous transitions, corresponding to finite jumps $|x-x'| = O(1)$.

Starting from the general master equation, the contribution of infinitesimal transitions can be expanded using the Kramers–Moyal expansion. If this expansion is truncated at second order, while finite jumps are retained explicitly, one obtains the following differential equation:

$$\begin{aligned}
\frac{\partial}{\partial t} P(x,t|x_0,t_0) =
&
\underbrace{- \sum_i \frac{\partial}{\partial x_i} [A_i(x,t) P(x,t|x_0,t_0)]}_{\text{Drift term (continuous)}}
\\[4pt]
&
\underbrace{+ \frac{1}{2} \sum_{i,j} \frac{\partial^2}{\partial x_i \partial x_j} [B_{ij}(x,t) P(x,t|x_0,t_0)]}_{\text{Diffusion term (continuous)}}
\\[4pt]
&
\underbrace{+ \int \mathrm{d}x'\, [W(x|x',t) P(x',t|x_0,t_0) - W(x'|x,t) P(x,t|x_0,t_0)]}_{\text{Jump term (discontinuous)}}
\end{aligned}$$

The first two terms describe the continuous component of the dynamics and correspond to a generalized Fokker–Planck equation. The integral term accounts for discontinuous transitions and has the standard gain–loss structure of a master equation.

Here:

- $A_i(x,t)$ are the drift coefficients,
- $B_{ij}(x,t)$ is the diffusion matrix (symmetric and positive semi-definite),
- $W(x|x',t)$ is the transition rate density for a jump from state $x'$ to $x$.

=== Special cases ===
Several well-known evolution equations arise as special cases of the Chapman–Kolmogorov differential form, depending on which continuous contributions—drift or diffusion—are present.

==== Wiener process ====
The Wiener process is a continuous Markov process characterized by pure diffusion, with zero drift and no jumps. Its transition probability density satisfies the diffusion equation

$\frac{\partial}{\partial t} P(x,t) = \frac{D}{2}\, \frac{\partial^2}{\partial x^2} P(x,t),$

which is obtained from the Chapman–Kolmogorov differential form by setting $A(x,t)=0$ and suppressing the jump term.

==== Fokker–Planck equation ====
The Fokker–Planck equation describes a Markov process with drift and diffusion, but without jumps. It corresponds to the Chapman–Kolmogorov differential form with nonzero drift coefficient $A(x,t)=\mu(x,t)$ and diffusion coefficient $B(x,t)=2D(x,t)$, and with the jump term suppressed:

$\frac{\partial}{\partial t} P(x,t) = -\frac{\partial}{\partial x}\!\left[\mu(x,t)\,P(x,t)\right] + \frac{\partial^2}{\partial x^2}\!\left[D(x,t)\,P(x,t)\right].$

==== Continuity (deterministic) equation ====
The Continuity equation describes a deterministic Markov process in which the probability density is transported by a drift field and no stochastic fluctuations are present. It is obtained from the Chapman–Kolmogorov differential form by retaining only the drift term:

$\frac{\partial}{\partial t} P(x,t) = -\frac{\partial}{\partial x}\!\left[\mu(x,t)\,P(x,t)\right].$

This equation expresses probability conservation along deterministic trajectories.

== See also ==
- Fokker–Planck equation (also known as Kolmogorov forward equation)
- Kolmogorov backward equation
- Examples of Markov chains
- Category of Markov kernels
