= Mixture (probability) =

In probability theory and statistics, a mixture is a probabilistic combination of two or more probability distributions. The concept arises mostly in two contexts:

- A mixture defining a new probability distribution from some existing ones, as in a mixture distribution or a compound distribution. Here a major problem often is to derive the properties of the resulting distribution.
- A mixture used as a statistical model such as is often used for statistical classification. The model may represent the population from which observations arise as a mixture of several components, and the problem is that of a mixture model, in which the task is to infer from which of a discrete set of sub-populations each observation originated.

== See also ==
- Mixture distribution
- Compound distribution
- Mixture model
- classification
- Cluster analysis
- Giry monad
