= Judgment and Decision Making =

Bimonthly peer-reviewed psychology journal covering decision making

- Subject: Decision making
- Language: English

Publication details
- History: 2006–present
- Publisher: Society for Judgment and Decision Making
- Frequency: Continuous
- Open access: Yes
- Impact factor: 2.5 (2022)

Standard abbreviations
- ISO 4: Judgm. Decis. Mak.

Indexing
- ISSN: 1930-2975
- LCCN: 2006212131
- OCLC no.: 1015868163

Links
- Journal homepage

Judgment and Decision Making is a peer-reviewed open access scientific journal covering the psychology of human judgment and decision making. It was established in 2006 by its founding editor, Jonathan Baron (University of Pennsylvania), who produced and hosted the journal independently until the end of 2022. Since 2023, it has been published by Cambridge University Press, with articles published continuously throughout the year in annual volumes rather than in separate issues. It is the official journal of the Society for Judgment and Decision Making and the European Association for Decision Making. As of 2026, its editors are Rachel Croson (University of Minnesota), Mandeep Dhami (Middlesex University London) and Andreas Glöckner (University of Cologne). According to Journal Citation Reports, the journal has a 2024 impact factor of 2.5.

The journal was an early adopter of open data policies in psychology. From 2011, its editors encouraged authors to submit their raw data at the time of review. A study of journal data sharing policies found that after this policy was introduced, the proportion of articles in the journal with openly available data rose sharply, whereas no such increase occurred in a comparable journal without such a policy.
