= Monoidal monad =

In category theory, a branch of mathematics, a monoidal monad $(T,\eta,\mu,T_{A,B},T_0)$ is a monad $(T,\eta,\mu)$ on a monoidal category $(C,\otimes,I)$ such that the functor $T:(C,\otimes,I)\to(C,\otimes,I)$ is a lax monoidal functor and the natural transformations $\eta$ and $\mu$ are monoidal natural transformations. In other words, $T$ is equipped with coherence maps $T_{A,B}:TA\otimes TB\to T(A\otimes B)$ and $T_0:I\to TI$ satisfying certain properties (again: they are lax monoidal), and the unit $\eta: id \Rightarrow T$ and multiplication $\mu:T^2\Rightarrow T$ are monoidal natural transformations. By monoidality of $\eta$, the morphisms $T_0$ and $\eta_I$ are necessarily equal.

All of the above can be compressed into the statement that a monoidal monad is a monad in the 2-category $\mathsf{MonCat}$ of monoidal categories, lax monoidal functors, and monoidal natural transformations.

== Opmonoidal monads ==
Opmonoidal monads have been studied under various names. Ieke Moerdijk introduced them as "Hopf monads", while in works of Bruguières and Virelizier they are called "bimonads", by analogy to "bialgebra", reserving the term "Hopf monad" for opmonoidal monads with an antipode, in analogy to "Hopf algebras".

An opmonoidal monad is a monad $(T,\eta,\mu)$ in the 2-category of $\mathsf{OpMonCat}$ monoidal categories, oplax monoidal functors and monoidal natural transformations. That means a monad $(T,\eta,\mu)$ on a monoidal category $(C,\otimes,I)$ together with coherence maps $T^{A,B}:T(A\otimes B) \to TA\otimes TB$ and $T^0:TI\to I$ satisfying three axioms that make an opmonoidal functor, and four more axioms that make the unit $\eta$ and the multiplication $\mu$ into opmonoidal natural transformations. Alternatively, an opmonoidal monad is a monad on a monoidal category such that the category of Eilenberg-Moore algebras has a monoidal structure for which the forgetful functor is strong monoidal.

An easy example for the monoidal category $\operatorname{Vect}$ of vector spaces is the monad $- \otimes A$, where $A$ is a bialgebra. The multiplication and unit of $A$ define the multiplication and unit of the monad, while the comultiplication and counit of $A$ give rise to the opmonoidal structure. The algebras of this monad are right $A$-modules, which one may tensor in the same way as their underlying vector spaces.

== Properties ==
- The Kleisli category of a monoidal monad has a canonical monoidal structure, induced by the monoidal structure of the monad, and such that the free functor is strong monoidal. The canonical adjunction between $C$ and the Kleisli category is a monoidal adjunction with respect to this monoidal structure, this means that the 2-category $\mathsf{MonCat}$ has Kleisli objects for monads.
- The 2-category of monads in $\mathsf{MonCat}$ is the 2-category of monoidal monads $\mathsf{Mnd(MonCat)}$ and it is isomorphic to the 2-category $\mathsf{Mon(Mnd(Cat))}$ of monoidales (or pseudomonoids) in the category of monads $\mathsf{Mnd(Cat)}$, (lax) monoidal arrows between them and monoidal cells between them.
- The Eilenberg-Moore category of an opmonoidal monad has a canonical monoidal structure such that the forgetful functor is strong monoidal. Thus, the 2-category $\mathsf{OpmonCat}$ has Eilenberg-Moore objects for monads.
- The 2-category of monads in $\mathsf{OpmonCat}$ is the 2-category of monoidal monads $\mathsf{Mnd(OpmonCat)}$ and it is isomorphic to the 2-category $\mathsf{Opmon(Mnd(Cat))}$ of monoidales (or pseudomonoids) in the category of monads $\mathsf{Mnd(Cat)}$ opmonoidal arrows between them and opmonoidal cells between them.

== Examples ==
The following monads on the category of sets, with its cartesian monoidal structure, are monoidal monads:

- The power set monad $(\mathbb{P},\varnothing,\cup)$. Indeed, there is a function $\mathbb{P}(X)\times\mathbb{P}(Y)\to\mathbb{P}(X\times Y)$, sending a pair $(X'\subseteq X,Y'\subseteq Y)$ of subsets to the subset $\{(x,y)\mid x\in X'\text{ and } y\in Y'\}\subseteq X\times Y$. This function is natural in X and Y. Together with the unique function $\{1\}\to\mathbb{P}(\varnothing)$ as well as the fact that $\mu,\eta$ are monoidal natural transformations, $\mathbb{P}$ is established as a monoidal monad.
- The probability distribution (Giry) monad.

The following monads on the category of sets, with its cartesian monoidal structure, are not monoidal monads

- If $M$ is a monoid, then $X\mapsto X\times M$ is a monad, but in general there is no reason to expect a monoidal structure on it (unless $M$ is commutative).
