= Monoidal adjunction =

In mathematics, a monoidal adjunction is an adjunction between monoidal categories which respects their monoidal structures.

Suppose that $(\mathcal C,\otimes,I)$ and $(\mathcal D,\bullet,J)$ are two monoidal categories. A monoidal adjunction between two lax monoidal functors

$(F,m):(\mathcal C,\otimes,I)\to (\mathcal D,\bullet,J)$ and $(G,n):(\mathcal D,\bullet,J)\to(\mathcal C,\otimes,I)$

is an adjunction $(F,G,\eta,\varepsilon)$ between the underlying functors, such that the natural transformations

$\eta:1_{\mathcal C}\Rightarrow G\circ F$ and $\varepsilon:F\circ G\Rightarrow 1_{\mathcal D}$

are monoidal natural transformations.

== Lifting adjunctions to monoidal adjunctions ==
Suppose that

$$(F,m):(\mathcal C,\otimes,I)\to (\mathcal D,\bullet,J)$$

is a lax monoidal functor such that the underlying functor $F:\mathcal C\to\mathcal D$ has a right adjoint $G:\mathcal D\to\mathcal C$. This adjunction lifts to a monoidal adjunction $(F,m)$⊣$(G,n)$ if and only if the lax monoidal functor $(F,m)$ is strong.

== See also ==
- Every monoidal adjunction $(F,m)$⊣$(G,n)$ defines a monoidal monad $G\circ F$.
