= Categorical probability =

In mathematics, the term categorical probability denotes a collection of category-theoretic approaches to probability theory and related fields such as statistics, information theory and ergodic theory.

The earliest ideas in the field were developed independently by Lawvere and by Chentsov, where they defined a version of what we today call the category of Markov kernels, and appeared in 1962 and 1965 respectively.

Some of the most widely used structures in the theory are

- The category of measurable spaces;
- Markov categories such as the category of Markov kernels;
- Probability monads such as Giry monad.
