= Kolmogorov's zero–one law =

Special case in probability theory; introduces tail events

In probability theory, Kolmogorov's zero–one law, named in honor of Andrey Nikolaevich Kolmogorov, specifies that a certain type of event, namely a tail event of independent σ-algebras, will either almost surely happen or almost surely not happen; that is, the probability of such an event occurring is zero or one.

Tail events are defined in terms of countably infinite families of σ-algebras. For illustrative purposes, we present here the special case in which each sigma algebra is generated by a random variable $X_k$ for $k\in\mathbb N$. Let $\mathcal{F}$ be the sigma-algebra generated jointly by all of the $X_k$. Then, a tail event $F \in \mathcal{F}$ is an event the occurrence of which cannot depend on the outcome of a finite subfamily of these random variables. (Note: $F$ belonging to $\mathcal{F}$ implies that membership in $F$ is uniquely determined by the values of the $X_k$, but the latter condition is strictly weaker and does not suffice to prove the zero-one law.) For example, the event that the sequence of the $X_k$ converges, and the event that its sum converges are both tail events. If the $X_k$ are, for example, all Bernoulli-distributed, then the event that there are infinitely many $k\in\mathbb N$ such that $X_k=X_{k+1}=\dots=X_{k+100}=1$ is a tail event. If each $X_k$ models the outcome of the $k^{th}$ coin toss in a modeled, infinite sequence of coin tosses, this means that a sequence of 100 consecutive heads occurring infinitely many times is a tail event in this model.

Tail events are precisely those events whose occurrence can still be determined if an arbitrarily large but finite initial segment of the $X_k$ is removed.

In many situations, it can be easy to apply Kolmogorov's zero–one law to show that some event has probability 0 or 1, but surprisingly hard to determine which of these two extreme values is the correct one.

== Formulation ==
A more general statement of Kolmogorov's zero–one law holds for sequences of independent σ-algebras. Let $(\Omega, F, P)$ be a probability space and let $F_n$ be a sequence of σ-algebras contained in $F$. Let

$$G_n=\sigma\bigg(\bigcup_{k=n}^\infty F_k\bigg)$$

be the smallest $\sigma$-algebra containing $F_n, F_{n+1}, ...$. Then the terminal $\sigma$-algebra of the $F_n$ is defined as $\mathcal T((F_n)_{n\in\mathbb N})=\bigcap_{n=1}^\infty G_n$.

Kolmogorov's zero–one law asserts that, if the $F_n$ are stochastically independent, then for any event $E\in \mathcal T((F_n)_{n\in\mathbb N})$, one has either $P(E) = 0$ or $P(E) = 1$.

The statement of the law in terms of random variables is obtained from the latter by taking each $F_n$ to be the σ-algebra generated by the random variable $X_n$. A tail event is then by definition an event which is measurable with respect to the σ-algebra generated by all $X_n$, but which is independent of any finite number of $X_n$. That is, a tail event is precisely an element of the terminal σ-algebra $\textstyle{\bigcap_{n=1}^\infty G_n}$.

== Examples ==
1. Let $(X,\mathcal{B},\mu)$ be a standard probability space, and let $T$ be an invertible, measure-preserving transformation. Then $T$ is called a Kolmogorov automorphism or K-automorphism, K-transform or K-shift, if there exists a sub-sigma algebra $\mathcal{K} \sub \mathcal{B}$ such that the following three properties hold:
  $$\mbox{(1) }\mathcal{K}\subset T\mathcal{K}$$
  $$\mbox{(2) }\bigvee_{n=0}^\infty T^n \mathcal{K}=\mathcal{B}$$
  $$\mbox{(3) }\bigcap_{n=0}^\infty T^{-n} \mathcal{K} = \{X,\varnothing\}$$
  Here, the symbol $\or$ is the join of sigma algebras, while $\cap$ is set intersection. The equality should be understood as holding almost everywhere, that is, differing at most on a set of measure zero. A K-automorphism by construction necessarily obeys Kolmogorov's 0-1 Law. It can be further shown that all Bernoulli automorphisms are K-automorphisms, but not vice versa.
2. The presence of an infinite cluster in the context of percolation theory also obeys the 0-1 law.
3. Let $\{X_n\}_n$ be a sequence of independent random variables, then the event $E$ defined below is a tail event:
  $$E = \left\{\lim _{n \rightarrow \infty} \sum_{k=1}^n X_k \text { exists }\right\}$$
  Thus by Kolmogorov's 0-1 law, it has either probability 0 or 1 to happen. Note that independence is required for the tail event condition to hold. Without independence we can consider a sequence that's either $(0,0,0,\dots)$ or $(1,1,1,\dots)$ with probability $\frac{1}{2}$ each. In this case the sum converges with probability $\frac{1}{2}$.

== Possible confusion with fat tails ==
The "tail events" in the Kolmogorov zero-one law are not related to the "tail events" in the sense of fat-tailed distributions (or the closely related long tails and tail risks). The events we consider in this article are things like convergence/non-convergence of sequences, while the latter type of event means something like "outliers".

== See also ==
- Borel–Cantelli lemma
- Hewitt–Savage zero–one law
- Lévy's zero–one law
- Tail sigma-algebra
