= Nuisance variable =

In the theory of stochastic processes in probability theory and statistics, a nuisance variable is a random variable that is fundamental to the probabilistic model, but that is of no particular interest in itself or is no longer of any interest: one such usage arises for the Chapman–Kolmogorov equation. For example, a model for a stochastic process may be defined conceptually using intermediate variables that are not observed in practice. If the problem is to derive the theoretical properties, such as the mean, variance and covariances of quantities that would be observed, then the intermediate variables are nuisance variables.

The related term nuisance factor has been used in the context of block experiments, where the terms in the model representing block-means, often called "factors", are of no interest. Many approaches to the analysis of such experiments, particularly where the experimental design is subject to randomization, treat these factors as random variables. More recently, "nuisance variable" has been used in the same context.

"Nuisance variable" has been used in the context of statistical surveys to refer information that is not of direct interest but which needs to be taken into account in an analysis.

In the context of stochastic models, the treatment of nuisance variables does not necessarily involve working with the full joint distribution of all the random variables involved, although this is one approach. Instead, an analysis may proceed directly to the quantities of interest.

The term nuisance variable is sometimes also used in more general contexts, simply to designate those variables that are marginalized over when finding a marginal distribution.
