= European Association for Decision Making =

Organization

- EADM logo
- Formation: August 1993
- Website: www.eadm.eu

The European Association for Decision Making, or EADM, is an interdisciplinary organization dedicated to the academic study of theories of decision making. The organization is an outgrowth of a series of biannual conferences held in Europe between 1969 and 1993, when the Association was officially organized.

The organization sponsors the annual de Finetti Award, named after statistician Bruno de Finetti, and organizes the biannual SPUDM conferences on probability and decision making.
