= Hewitt–Savage zero–one law =

Theorem in probability theory

The Hewitt–Savage zero–one law is a theorem in probability theory, similar to Kolmogorov's zero–one law and the Borel–Cantelli lemma, that specifies that a certain type of event will either almost surely happen or almost surely not happen. It is sometimes known as the Savage-Hewitt law for symmetric events. It is named after Edwin Hewitt and Leonard Jimmie Savage.

== Statement of the Hewitt-Savage zero-one law ==
Let $\left\{ X_n \right\}_{n = 1}^\infty$ be a sequence of independent and identically distributed random variables taking values in a set $\mathbb{X}$. The Hewitt-Savage zero–one law says that any event whose occurrence or non-occurrence is determined by the values of these random variables and whose occurrence or non-occurrence is unchanged by finite permutations of the indices, has probability either 0 or 1 (a “finite” permutation is one that leaves all but finitely many of the indices fixed).

Somewhat more abstractly, define the exchangeable sigma algebra or sigma algebra of symmetric events $\mathcal{E}$ to be the set of events (depending on the sequence of variables $\left\{ X_n \right\}_{n = 1}^\infty$) which are invariant under finite permutations of the indices in the sequence $\left\{ X_n \right\}_{n = 1}^\infty$. Then $A \in \mathcal{E} \implies \mathbb{P} (A) \in \{ 0, 1 \}$.

Since any finite permutation can be written as a product of transpositions, if we wish to check whether or not an event $A$ is symmetric (lies in $\mathcal{E}$), it is enough to check if its occurrence is unchanged by an arbitrary transposition $(i, j)$, $i, j \in \mathbb{N}$.

== Example ==
Let the sequence $\left\{ X_n \right\}_{n = 1}^\infty$ of independent and identically distributed random variables taking values in $\R$. Consider the random walk $S_N= \sum_{n = 1}^N X_n$. Then one of the following occurs with probability 1:

- $S_N=0$
- $S_N\to\infty$
- $S_N\to-\infty$
- $\liminf S_N = -\infty$ and $\limsup S_N = \infty$.

Since S_{N} are not independent the Kolmogorov's zero–one law is not directly applicable.

First consider the case when X_{1} is a.s. constant. Then with probability 1 we have that either ($S_N=0$), ($S_N\to\infty$) or ($S_N\to-\infty$).

Now consider the case, when X_{1} is not a.s. constant. Then for any $t\in[-\infty,\infty]$ the event $\left\{\limsup S_N\geq t \right\}$ is in the exchangeable sigma algebra. That is because limit supremum does not change with finite permutation of the indices. From Hewitt-Savage zero-one law we have that

$$\mathbb{P}\left(\limsup S_N\geq t \right) \in \{0,1\}$$.

There has to exist t, where probability switches from 0 to 1 i.e. exists $t^*\in[-\infty,\infty]$ such that $\limsup S_n = t^*$ almost surely. Similarly exists $t_*\in[-\infty,\infty]$ such that $\liminf S_n = t_*$ almost surely.

Since almost surely

$$t^*=\limsup S_N = X_1 + \limsup \sum_{n = 2}^N X_n=X_1+t^*$$

and X_{1} is not a.s. 0, then $t^*$ is not finite. Similarly $t_*$ in not finite.

Therefore, with probability 1 either ($S_N\to\infty$), ($S_N\to-\infty$) or ($\liminf S_N = -\infty$ and $\limsup S_N = \infty$).
