= Independent and identically distributed random variables =

Concept in probability and statistics

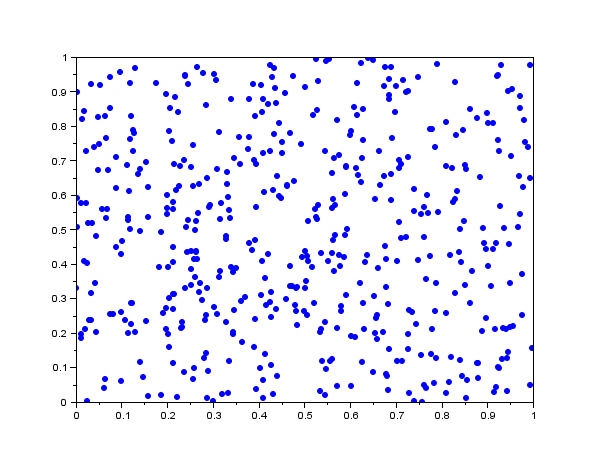
A chart showing a uniform distribution

In probability theory and statistics, a collection of random variables is independent and identically distributed (i.i.d., iid, or IID) if each random variable has the same probability distribution as the others and all are mutually independent. IID was first defined in statistics and finds application in many fields, such as data mining and signal processing.

== Introduction ==
Statistics commonly deals with random samples. A random sample can be thought of as a set of objects that are chosen randomly. More formally, it is "a sequence of independent, identically distributed (IID) random data points."

In other words, the terms random sample and IID are synonymous. In statistics, "random sample" is the typical terminology, but in probability, it is more common to say "IID."

- Identically distributed means that there are no overall trends — the distribution does not fluctuate and all items in the sample are taken from the same probability distribution.
- Independent means that the sample items are all independent events. In other words, they are not connected to each other in any way; knowledge of the value of one variable gives no information about the value of the other and vice versa.

== Application ==
Independent and identically distributed random variables are often used as an assumption, which tends to simplify the underlying mathematics. In practical applications of statistical modeling, however, this assumption may or may not be realistic.

The i.i.d. assumption is also used in the central limit theorem, which states that the probability distribution of the sum (or average) of i.i.d. variables with finite variance approaches a normal distribution.

The i.i.d. assumption frequently arises in the context of sequences of random variables. Then, "independent and identically distributed" implies that an element in the sequence is independent of the random variables that came before it. In this way, an i.i.d. sequence is different from a Markov sequence, where the probability distribution for the nth random variable is a function of the previous random variable in the sequence (for a first-order Markov sequence). An i.i.d. sequence does not imply the probabilities for all elements of the sample space or event space must be the same. For example, repeated throws of loaded dice will produce a sequence that is i.i.d., despite the outcomes being biased.

In signal processing and image processing, the notion of transformation to i.i.d. implies two specifications, the "i.d." part and the "i." part:

i.d. – The signal level must be balanced on the time axis.

i. – The signal spectrum must be flattened, i.e. transformed by filtering (such as deconvolution) to a white noise signal (i.e., a signal where all frequencies are equally present).

== Definition ==
=== Definition for two random variables ===
Suppose that the random variables $X$ and $Y$ are defined to assume values in $I \subseteq \mathbb{R}$. Let $F_X(x) = \operatorname{P}(X\leq x)$ and $F_Y(y) = \operatorname{P}(Y\leq y)$ be the cumulative distribution functions of $X$ and $Y$, respectively, and denote their joint cumulative distribution function by $F_{X,Y}(x,y) = \operatorname{P}(X\leq x \land Y\leq y)$.

Two random variables $X$ and $Y$ are independent if and only if $F_{X,Y}(x,y) = F_{X}(x) \cdot F_{Y}(y)$ for all $x,y \in I$. (For the simpler case of events, two events $A$ and $B$ are independent if and only if $P(A\land B) = P(A) \cdot P(B)$, see also Independence (probability theory) § Two random variables.)

Two random variables $X$ and $Y$ are identically distributed if and only if $F_X(x)=F_Y(x)$ for all $x \in I$.

Two random variables $X$ and $Y$ are i.i.d. if they are independent and identically distributed, i.e. if and only if

$$\begin{align}
& F_X(x)=F_Y(x) \, & \forall x \in I \\
& F_{X,Y}(x,y) = F_{X}(x) \cdot F_{Y}(y) \, & \forall x,y \in I
\end{align}$$

=== Definition for more than two random variables ===
The definition extends naturally to more than two random variables. We say that $n$ random variables $X_1,\ldots,X_n$ are i.i.d. if they are independent (see further Independence (probability theory) § More than two random variables) and identically distributed, i.e. if and only if

$$\begin{align}
& F_{X_1}(x)=F_{X_k}(x) \, & \forall k \in \{1,\ldots,n \} \text{ and } \forall x \in I \\
& F_{X_1,\ldots,X_n}(x_1,\ldots,x_n) = F_{X_1}(x_1) \cdot \ldots \cdot F_{X_n}(x_n) \, & \forall x_1,\ldots,x_n \in I
\end{align}$$

where $F_{X_1,\ldots,X_n}(x_1,\ldots,x_n) = \operatorname{P}(X_1\leq x_1 \land \ldots \land X_n\leq x_n)$ denotes the joint cumulative distribution function of $X_1,\ldots,X_n$.

== Examples ==
=== Example 1 ===
A sequence of outcomes of spins of a fair or unfair roulette wheel is i.i.d. One implication of this is that if the roulette ball lands on "red", for example, 20 times in a row, the next spin is no more or less likely to be "black" than on any other spin (see the gambler's fallacy).

=== Example 2 ===
Toss a coin 10 times and write down the results into variables $A_1,\ldots,A_{10}$.

1. Independent: Each outcome $A_i$ will not affect the other outcome $A_j$ (for $i\neq j$ from 1 to 10), which means the variables $A_1,\ldots,A_{10}$ are independent of each other.
2. Identically distributed: Regardless of whether the coin is fair (with a probability of 1/2 for heads) or biased, as long as the same coin is used for each flip, the probability of getting heads remains consistent across all flips.

Such a sequence of i.i.d. variables is also called a Bernoulli process.

=== Example 3 ===
Roll a die 10 times and save the results into variables $A_1,\ldots,A_{10}$.

1. Independent: Each outcome of the die roll will not affect the next one, which means the 10 variables are independent from each other.
2. Identically distributed: Regardless of whether the die is fair or weighted, each roll will have the same probability of seeing each result as every other roll. In contrast, rolling 10 different dice, some of which are weighted and some of which are not, would not produce i.i.d. variables.

=== Example 4 ===
Choose a card from a standard deck of cards containing 52 cards, then place the card back in the deck. Repeat this 52 times. Observe when a king appears.

1. Independent: Each observation will not affect the next one, which means the 52 results are independent from each other. In contrast, if each card that is drawn is kept out of the deck, subsequent draws would be affected by it (drawing one king would make drawing a second king less likely), and the observations would not be independent.
2. Identically distributed: After drawing one card from it (and then returning the card to the deck), each time the probability for a king is 4/52, which means the probability is identical each time.

== Generalizations ==
Many results that were first proven under the assumption that the random variables are i.i.d. have been shown to be true even under a weaker distributional assumption.

=== Exchangeable random variables ===
The most general notion which shares the main properties of i.i.d. variables are exchangeable random variables, introduced by Bruno de Finetti. Exchangeability means that while variables may not be independent, future ones behave like past ones — formally, any value of a finite sequence is as likely as any permutation of those values — the joint probability distribution is invariant under the symmetric group.

This provides a useful generalization — for example, sampling without replacement is not independent, but is exchangeable.

=== Lévy process ===
In stochastic calculus, i.i.d. variables are thought of as a discrete time Lévy process: each variable gives how much one changes from one time to another. For example, a sequence of Bernoulli trials is interpreted as the Bernoulli process.

This could be generalized to include continuous time Lévy processes, and many Lévy processes can be seen as limits of i.i.d. variables—for instance, the Wiener process is the limit of the Bernoulli process.

== In machine learning ==
Machine learning (ML) involves learning statistical relationships within data. To train ML models effectively, it is crucial to use data that is broadly generalizable. If the training data is insufficiently representative of the task, the model's performance on new, unseen data may be poor.

The i.i.d. hypothesis allows for a significant reduction in the number of individual cases required in the training sample, simplifying optimization calculations. In optimization problems, the assumption of independent and identical distribution simplifies the calculation of the likelihood function. Due to this assumption, the likelihood function can be expressed as:

$l(\theta) = P(x_1, x_2, x_3,...,x_n|\theta) = P(x_1|\theta) P(x_2|\theta) P(x_3|\theta) ... P(x_n|\theta)$

To maximize the probability of the observed event, the log function is applied to maximize the parameter $\theta$. Specifically, it computes:

$\mathop{\rm argmax}\limits_\theta \log(l(\theta))$

where

$\log(l(\theta)) = \log(P(x_1|\theta)) + \log(P(x_2|\theta)) + \log(P(x_3|\theta)) + ... + \log(P(x_n|\theta))$

Computers are very efficient at performing multiple additions, but not as efficient at performing multiplications. This simplification enhances computational efficiency. The log transformation, in the process of maximizing, converts many exponential functions into linear functions.

There are two main reasons why this hypothesis is practically useful with the central limit theorem (CLT):

1. Even if the sample originates from a complex non-Gaussian distribution, it can be well-approximated because the CLT allows it to be simplified to a Gaussian distribution.
2. The second reason is that the model's accuracy depends on the simplicity and representational power of the model unit, as well as the data quality. The simplicity of the unit makes it easy to interpret and scale, while the representational power and scalability improve model accuracy. In a deep neural network, for instance, each neuron is simple yet powerful in representation, layer by layer, capturing more complex features to enhance model accuracy.

== See also ==
- De Finetti's theorem
- Pairwise independent variables
- Central limit theorem
