= Monoidal functor =

Concept in category theory

In category theory, monoidal functors are functors between monoidal categories which preserve the monoidal structure. More specifically, a monoidal functor between two monoidal categories consists of a functor between the categories, along with two coherence maps—a natural transformation and a morphism that preserve monoidal multiplication and unit, respectively. Mathematicians require these coherence maps to satisfy additional properties depending on how strictly they want to preserve the monoidal structure; each of these properties gives rise to a slightly different definition of monoidal functors

- The coherence maps of lax monoidal functors satisfy no additional properties; they are not necessarily invertible.
- The coherence maps of strong monoidal functors are invertible.
- The coherence maps of strict monoidal functors are identity maps.

Although we distinguish between these different definitions here, authors may call any one of these simply monoidal functors.

== Definition ==
Let $(\mathcal C,\otimes,I_{\mathcal C})$ and $(\mathcal D,\bullet,I_{\mathcal D})$ be monoidal categories. A lax monoidal functor from $\mathcal C$ to $\mathcal D$ (which may also just be called a monoidal functor) consists of a functor $F:\mathcal C\to\mathcal D$ together with a natural transformation

$$\phi_{A,B}:FA\bullet FB\to F(A\otimes B)$$

between functors $\mathcal{C}\times\mathcal{C}\to\mathcal{D}$ and a morphism

$$\phi:I_{\mathcal D}\to FI_{\mathcal C}$$,

called the coherence maps or structure morphisms, which are such that for every three objects $A$, $B$ and $C$ of $\mathcal C$ the diagrams

,

and

commute in the category $\mathcal D$. Above, the various natural transformations denoted using $\alpha, \rho, \lambda$ are parts of the monoidal structure on $\mathcal C$ and $\mathcal D$.

=== Variants ===
- The dual of a monoidal functor is a comonoidal functor; it is a monoidal functor whose coherence maps are reversed. Comonoidal functors may also be called opmonoidal, colax monoidal, or oplax monoidal functors.
- A strong monoidal functor is a monoidal functor whose coherence maps $\phi_{A,B}, \phi$ are invertible.
- A strict monoidal functor is a monoidal functor whose coherence maps are identities.
- A braided monoidal functor is a monoidal functor between braided monoidal categories (with braidings denoted $\gamma$) such that the following diagram commutes for every pair of objects A, B in $\mathcal C$ :

- A symmetric monoidal functor is a braided monoidal functor whose domain and codomain are symmetric monoidal categories.

== Examples ==
- The underlying functor $U\colon(\mathbf{Ab},\otimes_\mathbf{Z},\mathbf{Z}) \rightarrow (\mathbf{Set},\times,\{\ast\})$ from the category of abelian groups to the category of sets. In this case, the map $\phi_{A,B}\colon U(A)\times U(B)\to U(A\otimes B)$ sends (a, b) to $a\otimes b$; the map $\phi\colon \{*\}\to\mathbb Z$ sends $\ast$ to 1.
- If $R$ is a (commutative) ring, then the free functor $\mathsf{Set},\to R\mathsf{-mod}$ extends to a strongly monoidal functor $(\mathsf{Set},\sqcup,\emptyset)\to (R\mathsf{-mod},\oplus,0)$ (and also $(\mathsf{Set},\times,\{\ast\})\to (R\mathsf{-mod},\otimes,R)$ if $R$ is commutative).
- If $R\to S$ is a homomorphism of commutative rings, then the restriction functor $(S\mathsf{-mod},\otimes_S,S)\to(R\mathsf{-mod},\otimes_R,R)$ is monoidal and the induction functor $(R\mathsf{-mod},\otimes_R,R)\to(S\mathsf{-mod},\otimes_S,S)$ is strongly monoidal.
- An important example of a symmetric monoidal functor is the mathematical model of topological quantum field theory. Let $\mathbf{Bord}_{\langle n-1,n\rangle}$ be the category of cobordisms of n-1,n-dimensional manifolds with tensor product given by disjoint union, and unit the empty manifold. A topological quantum field theory in dimension n is a symmetric monoidal functor $F\colon(\mathbf{Bord}_{\langle n-1,n\rangle},\sqcup,\emptyset)\rightarrow(\mathbf{kVect},\otimes_k,k).$
- The homology functor is monoidal as $(Ch(R\mathsf{-mod}),\otimes,R[0]) \to (grR\mathsf{-mod},\otimes,R[0])$ via the map $H_\ast(C_1)\otimes H_\ast(C_2) \to H_\ast(C_1\otimes C_2), [x_1]\otimes[x_2] \mapsto [x_1\otimes x_2]$.

== Alternate notions ==
If $(\mathcal C,\otimes,I_{\mathcal C})$ and $(\mathcal D,\bullet,I_{\mathcal D})$ are closed monoidal categories with internal hom-functors $\Rightarrow_{\mathcal C},\Rightarrow_{\mathcal D}$ (we drop the subscripts for readability), there is an alternative formulation

ψ_{AB} : F(A ⇒ B) → FA ⇒ FB

of φ_{AB} commonly used in functional programming. The relation between ψ_{AB} and φ_{AB} is illustrated in the following commutative diagrams:

== Properties ==
- If $(M,\mu,\epsilon)$ is a monoid object in $C$, then $(FM,F\mu\circ\phi_{M,M},F\epsilon\circ\phi)$ is a monoid object in $D$.

== Monoidal functors and adjunctions ==
Suppose that a functor $F:\mathcal C\to\mathcal D$ is left adjoint to a monoidal $(G,n):(\mathcal D,\bullet,I_{\mathcal D})\to(\mathcal C,\otimes,I_{\mathcal C})$. Then $F$ has a comonoidal structure $(F,m)$ induced by $(G,n)$, defined by

$$m_{A,B}=\varepsilon_{FA\bullet FB}\circ Fn_{FA,FB}\circ F(\eta_A\otimes \eta_B):F(A\otimes B)\to FA\bullet FB$$

and

$$m=\varepsilon_{I_{\mathcal D}}\circ Fn:FI_{\mathcal C}\to I_{\mathcal D}$$.

If the induced structure on $F$ is strong, then the unit and counit of the adjunction are monoidal natural transformations, and the adjunction is said to be a monoidal adjunction; conversely, the left adjoint of a monoidal adjunction is always a strong monoidal functor.

Similarly, a right adjoint to a comonoidal functor is monoidal, and the right adjoint of a comonoidal adjunction is a strong monoidal functor.

== See also ==
- Monoidal natural transformation
