= Bruno de Finetti =

Italian mathematician (1906–1985)

- Born: 13 June 1906; Innsbruck, Austria-Hungary
- Died: 20 July 1985 (aged 79); Rome, Italy
- Education: Università degli Studi di Milano
- Known for: De Finetti diagram De Finetti's theorem Kolmogorov–Nagumo–de Finetti mean Dutch book theorems Infinite divisibility Mean-variance analysis Predictive inference
- Awards: ICM Speaker (1928)
- Scientific career
- Workplaces: Italian National Institute of Statistics; Assicurazioni Generali; University of Trieste; University of Padua; Sapienza University of Rome

Bruno de Finetti (13 June 1906 – 20 July 1985) was an Italian probabilist statistician and actuary, noted for the "operational subjective" conception of probability. The classic exposition of his distinctive theory is the 1937 “La prévision: ses lois logiques, ses sources subjectives", which discussed probability founded on the coherence of betting odds and the consequences of exchangeability.

== Life ==
De Finetti was born in Innsbruck, Austria-Hungary, and studied mathematics at Politecnico di Milano. He graduated in 1927, writing his thesis under the supervision of Giulio Vivanti. After graduation, he worked as an actuary and a statistician at the Istituto Nazionale di Statistica (National Institute of Statistics) in Rome and, from 1931, the Trieste insurance company Assicurazioni Generali. In 1936 he won a competition for Chair of Financial Mathematics and Statistics, but was not nominated due to a fascist law barring access to unmarried candidates; he was appointed as ordinary professor at the University of Trieste only in 1950.

He published extensively (17 papers in 1930 alone, according to Lindley) and acquired an international reputation in the small world of probability mathematicians. He taught mathematical analysis in Padua and then won a chair in Financial Mathematics at Trieste University (1939). In 1954, he moved to the Sapienza University of Rome, first to another chair in Financial Mathematics and then, from 1961 to 1976, one in the Calculus of Probabilities. De Finetti developed his ideas on subjective probability in the 1920s independently of Frank P. Ramsey. Later, according to the preface of his Theory of Probability, he drew on ideas of Harold Jeffreys, I. J. Good and B. O. Koopman. He also reasoned about the connection of economics and probability, and thought that guiding principles to be Paretian optimum were further inspired by "fairness" criteria. De Finetti held different social and political beliefs through his life: following fascism during his youth, then moving to Christian socialism and finally adhering to the Radical Party.

De Finett became known in the Anglo-American statistical world only in the 1950s when L. J. Savage, who had independently adopted subjectivism, drew him into it; another great champion was Dennis Lindley. De Finetti died in Rome in 1985.

== Work and impact ==
De Finetti emphasized a predictive inference approach to statistics; he proposed a thought experiment along the following lines (described in greater detail at coherence): You must set the price of a promise to pay $1 if there was life on Mars 1 billion years ago, and $0 if there was not, and tomorrow the answer will be revealed. You know that your opponent will be able to choose either to buy such a promise from you at the price you have set, or require you to buy such a promise from your opponent, still at the same price. In other words: you set the odds, but your opponent decides which side of the bet will be yours. The price you set is the "operational subjective probability" that you assign to the proposition on which you are betting. This price has to obey the probability axioms if you are not to face certain loss, as you would if you set a price above $1 (or a negative price). By considering bets on more than one event, de Finetti could justify additivity. Prices, or equivalently odds, that do not expose you to certain loss through a Dutch book are called coherent.

De Finetti is also noted for de Finetti's theorem on exchangeable sequences of random variables. De Finetti was not the first to study exchangeability, but he brought the subject to greater visibility. He started publishing on exchangeability in the late 1920s, but his 1937 article "La Prévision" (see bibliography) is his most famous treatment.

In 1929, de Finetti introduced the concept of infinitely divisible probability distributions.

He also introduced de Finetti diagrams for graphing genotype frequencies.

The 1974 English translation of his book is credited with reviving interest in predictive inference in the Anglophone world and bringing the idea of exchangeability to its attention.

In 1961, he was elected as a Fellow of the American Statistical Association. The de Finetti Award, presented annually by the European Association for Decision Making, is named after him. The Department of Mathematics, Statistics and Economics of the University of Trieste is named after him too.

In the 21st century quantum extensions of de Finetti's representation theorem have been found to be useful in quantum information, in topics like quantum key distribution and entanglement detection.

== Bibliography ==
=== English translations ===
(The following are translations of works originally published in Italian or French.)

- "Probabilism: A Critical Essay on the Theory of Probability and on the Value of Science," (translation of 1931 article) in Erkenntnis, volume 31, issue 2–3, September 1989, pp. 169–223. The entire double issue is devoted to de Finetti's philosophy of probability.
- 1937, "La Prévision: ses lois logiques, ses sources subjectives," Annales de l'Institut Henri Poincaré,: - "Foresight: its Logical Laws, Its Subjective Sources," (translation of the 1937 article in French) in H. E. Kyburg and H. E. Smokler (eds), Studies in Subjective Probability, New York: Wiley, 1964.
- Theory of Probability, (translation by A Machi and AFM Smith of 1970 book) 2 volumes, New York: Wiley, 1974–1975.

=== Discussions ===
- D. V. Lindley, "Bruno de Finetti, 1906-1985 (Obituary)" Journal of the Royal Statistical Society, Series A, 149, p. 252 (1986).

The following books have a chapter on de Finetti and references to further literature.

- Jan von Plato, Creating Modern Probability: Its Mathematics, Physics, and Philosophy in Historical Perspective, Cambridge: Cambridge University Press, 1994.
- Donald Gillies, Philosophical Theories of Probability, London: Routledge, 2000.

== See also ==
- Exchangeability
- Quasiconvex function
