= Monoidal natural transformation =

Suppose that $(\mathcal C,\otimes,I)$ and $(\mathcal D,\bullet, J)$ are two monoidal categories and

$(F,m):(\mathcal C,\otimes,I)\to(\mathcal D,\bullet, J)$ and $(G,n):(\mathcal C,\otimes,I)\to(\mathcal D,\bullet, J)$

are two lax monoidal functors between those categories.

A monoidal natural transformation

$$\theta:(F,m) \to (G,n)$$

between those functors is a natural transformation $\theta:F \to G$ between the underlying functors such that the diagrams

and

commute for every objects $A$ and $B$ of $\mathcal C$.

A symmetric monoidal natural transformation is a monoidal natural transformation between symmetric monoidal functors.
