= Measurable space =

Basic object in measure theory; set and a sigma-algebra

In mathematics, a measurable space or Borel space is a basic object in measure theory. It consists of a set and a σ-algebra, which defines the subsets that will be measured.

It captures and generalises intuitive notions such as length, area, and volume with a set $X$ of 'points' in the space, but regions of the space are the elements of the σ-algebra, since the intuitive measures are not usually defined for points. The algebra also captures the relationships that might be expected of regions: that a region can be defined as an intersection of other regions, a union of other regions, or the space with the exception of another region.

== Definition ==
Consider a set $X$ and a σ-algebra $\Sigma$ on $X.$ Then the tuple $(X, \Sigma)$ is called a measurable space. The elements of $\Sigma$ are called measurable sets within the measurable space.

Note that in contrast to a measure space, no measure is needed for a measurable space.

== Example ==
Consider the set
$$X = \{1,2,3\}.$$
One possible $\sigma$-algebra would be
$$\Sigma_1 = \{X, \varnothing\}.$$
Then $\left(X, \Sigma_1 \right)$ is a measurable space. Another possible $\sigma$-algebra would be the power set on $X$:
$$\Sigma_2 = \mathcal P(X).$$
With this, a second measurable space on the set $X$ is given by $\left(X, \Sigma_2\right).$

== Common measurable spaces ==
If $X$ is finite or countably infinite, the $\sigma$-algebra is most often the power set on $X,$ so $\Sigma = \mathcal P(X).$ This leads to the measurable space $(X, \mathcal P(X)).$

If $X$ is a topological space, the $\sigma$-algebra is most commonly the Borel $\sigma$-algebra $\mathcal B,$ so $\Sigma = \mathcal B(X).$ This leads to the measurable space $(X, \mathcal B(X))$ that is common for all topological spaces such as the real numbers $\R.$

== Ambiguity with Borel spaces ==
The term Borel space is used for different types of measurable spaces. It can refer to

- any measurable space, so it is a synonym for a measurable space as defined above
- a measurable space that is Borel isomorphic to a measurable subset of the real numbers (again with the Borel $\sigma$-algebra)

Families $\mathcal{F}$ of sets over $\Omega$
Is necessarily true of $\mathcal{F}\colon$ or, is $\mathcal{F}$ closed under:	Directed by $\,\supseteq$	$A \cap B$	$A \cup B$	$B \setminus A$	$\Omega \setminus A$	$A_1 \cap A_2 \cap \cdots$	$A_1 \cup A_2 \cup \cdots$	$\Omega \in \mathcal{F}$	$\varnothing \in \mathcal{F}$	F.I.P.
π-system	Yes	Yes	No	No	No	No	No	No	No	No
Semiring	Yes	Yes	No	No	No	No	No	No	Yes	Never
Semialgebra (semifield)	Yes	Yes	No	No	No	No	No	No	Yes	Never
Monotone class	No	No	No	No	No	only if $A_i \searrow$	only if $A_i \nearrow$	No	No	No
𝜆-system (Dynkin system)	Yes	No	No	only if $A \subseteq B$	Yes	No	only if $A_i \nearrow$ or they are disjoint	Yes	Yes	Never
Ring (order theory)	Yes	Yes	Yes	No	No	No	No	No	No	No
Ring (measure theory)	Yes	Yes	Yes	Yes	No	No	No	No	Yes	Never
δ-ring	Yes	Yes	Yes	Yes	No	Yes	No	No	Yes	Never
𝜎-ring	Yes	Yes	Yes	Yes	No	Yes	Yes	No	Yes	Never
Algebra (field)	Yes	Yes	Yes	Yes	Yes	No	No	Yes	Yes	Never
𝜎-algebra (𝜎-field)	Yes	Yes	Yes	Yes	Yes	Yes	Yes	Yes	Yes	Never
Filter	Yes	Yes	Yes	No	No	No	Yes	Yes	No	No
Proper filter	Yes	Yes	Yes	Never	Never	No	Yes	Yes	Never	Yes
Prefilter (filter base)	Yes	No	No	No	No	No	No	No	No	Yes
Filter subbase	No	No	No	No	No	No	No	No	No	Yes
Open topology	Yes	Yes	Yes	No	No	No	(even arbitrary $\cup$)	Yes	Yes	Never
Closed topology	Yes	Yes	Yes	No	No	(even arbitrary $\cap$)	No	Yes	Yes	Never
Is necessarily true of $\mathcal{F}\colon$ or, is $\mathcal{F}$ closed under:	directed downward	finite intersections	finite unions	relative complements	complements in $\Omega$	countable intersections	countable unions	contains $\Omega$	contains $\varnothing$	Finite intersection property
Additionally, a semiring is a π-system where every complement $B \setminus A$ is equal to a finite disjoint union of sets in $\mathcal{F}.$ A semialgebra is a semiring where every complement $\Omega \setminus A$ is equal to a finite disjoint union of sets in $\mathcal{F}.$ $A, B, A_1, A_2, \ldots$ are arbitrary elements of $\mathcal{F}$ and it is assumed that $\mathcal{F} \neq \varnothing.$

== See also ==
- Borel set – Class of mathematical sets
- Measurable function – Kind of mathematical function
- Measure – Generalization of mass, length, area and volume
- Standard Borel space – Mathematical construction in topology
- Category of measurable spaces
