= Standard Borel space =

Mathematical construction in topology

In mathematics, a standard Borel space is the Borel space associated with a Polish space. Except in the case of discrete Polish spaces, the standard Borel space is unique, up to isomorphism of measurable spaces.

== Formal definition ==
A measurable space $(X, \Sigma)$ is said to be "standard Borel" if there exists a metric on $X$ that makes it a complete separable metric space in such a way that $\Sigma$ is then the Borel σ-algebra. Standard Borel spaces have several useful properties that do not hold for general measurable spaces.

== Properties ==
- If $(X, \Sigma)$ and $(Y, T)$ are standard Borel then any bijective measurable mapping $f : (X, \Sigma) \to (Y, \Tau)$ is an isomorphism (that is, the inverse mapping is also measurable). This follows from Souslin's theorem, as a set that is both analytic and coanalytic is necessarily Borel.
- If $(X, \Sigma)$ and $(Y, T)$ are standard Borel spaces and $f : X \to Y$ then $f$ is measurable if and only if the graph of $f$ is Borel.
- The product and direct union of a countable family of standard Borel spaces are standard.
- Every complete probability measure on a standard Borel space turns it into a standard probability space.

== Kuratowski's theorem ==
Theorem. Let $X$ be a Polish space, that is, a topological space such that there is a metric $d$ on $X$ that defines the topology of $X$ and that makes $X$ a complete separable metric space. Then $X$ as a Borel space is Borel isomorphic to one of (1) $\R,$ (2) $\Z$ or (3) a finite discrete space. (This result is reminiscent of Maharam's theorem.)

It follows that a standard Borel space is characterized up to isomorphism by its cardinality, and that any uncountable standard Borel space has the cardinality of the continuum.

Borel isomorphisms on standard Borel spaces are analogous to homeomorphisms on topological spaces: both are bijective and closed under composition, and a homeomorphism and its inverse are both continuous, instead of both being only Borel measurable.

== See also ==
- Measurable space – Basic object in measure theory; set and a sigma-algebra
