= Martina Zähle =

German mathematician

Martina Zähle (born 1950) is a German mathematician specializing in geometric measure theory and stochastic geometry. She is a professor of mathematics at the University of Jena, where she holds the chair for geometry.

Zähle completed her doctorate in 1978 at the University of Jena. Her dissertation, Ergodizitätseigenschaften von Strömungsmodellen mit Anwendungen in der Bedienungstheorie, was supervised by Joseph Mecke. She earned a habilitation at Jena in 1982.

She is the coauthor of the book Curvature Measures of Singular Sets (with Jan Rataj, Springer, 2019).
