= Simple point process =

A simple point process is a special type of point process in probability theory. In simple point processes, every point is assigned the weight one.

== Definition ==
Let $S$ be a locally compact second countable Hausdorff space and let $\mathcal S$ be its Borel $\sigma$-algebra. A point process $\xi$, interpreted as random measure on $(S, \mathcal S)$, is called a simple point process if it can be written as

$$\xi =\sum_{i \in I} \delta_{X_i}$$

for an index set $I$ and random elements $X_i$ which are almost everywhere pairwise distinct. Here $\delta_x$ denotes the Dirac measure on the point $x$.

== Examples ==
Simple point processes include many important classes of point processes such as Poisson processes, Cox processes and binomial processes.

== Uniqueness ==
If $\mathcal I$ is a generating ring of $\mathcal S$ then a simple point process $\xi$ is uniquely determined by its values on the sets $U \in \mathcal I$. This means that two simple point processes $\xi$ and $\zeta$ have the same distributions iff

$$P(\xi(U)=0) = P(\zeta(U)=0) \text{ for all } U \in \mathcal I$$

== Literature ==
- Kallenberg, Olav (2017). Random Measures, Theory and Applications. Probability Theory and Stochastic Modelling. Vol. 77. Switzerland: Springer. doi:10.1007/978-3-319-41598-7. ISBN 978-3-319-41596-3.
- Daley, D.J.; Vere-Jones, D. (2003). An Introduction to the Theory of Point Processes: Volume I: Elementary Theory and Methods. New York: Springer. ISBN 0-387-95541-0.
