= Signal-to-interference-plus-noise ratio =

Information theory quantity

In information theory and telecommunication engineering, the signal-to-interference-plus-noise ratio (SINR) (also known as the signal-to-noise-plus-interference ratio (SNIR)) is a quantity used to give theoretical upper bounds on channel capacity (or the rate of information transfer) in wireless communication systems such as networks. Analogous to the signal-to-noise ratio (SNR) used often in wired communications systems, the SINR is defined as the power of a certain signal of interest divided by the sum of the interference power (from all the other interfering signals) and the power of some background noise. If the power of noise term is zero, then the SINR reduces to the signal-to-interference ratio (SIR). Conversely, zero interference reduces the SINR to the SNR, which is used less often when developing mathematical models of wireless networks such as cellular networks.

The complexity and randomness of certain types of wireless networks and signal propagation has motivated the use of stochastic geometry models in order to model the SINR, particularly for cellular or mobile phone networks.

== Description ==
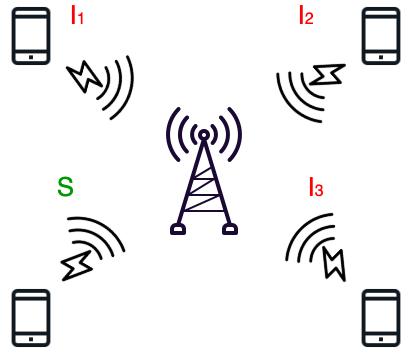
A short illustration of the case when UE (user equipment) communicates with base station in presence of the interference. S means the power of the incoming signal of interest, and I-s mean interference signals. UE may lose the connection if either signal S is too weak or sum of interference signals is too large.

SINR is commonly used in wireless communication as a way to measure the quality of wireless connections. Typically, the energy of a signal fades with distance, which is referred to as a path loss in wireless networks. Conversely, in wired networks the existence of a wired path between the sender or transmitter and the receiver determines the correct reception of data. In a wireless network one has to take other factors into account (e.g. the background noise, interfering strength of other simultaneous transmission). The concept of SINR attempts to create a representation of this aspect.

== Mathematical definition ==
The definition of SINR is usually defined for a particular receiver (or user). In particular, for a receiver located at some point x in space (usually, on the plane), then its corresponding SINR given by

$$\mathrm{SINR}(x) {{=}} \frac{P}{I+N}$$

where P is the power of the incoming signal of interest, I is the interference power of the other (interfering) signals in the network, and N is some noise term, which may be a constant or random. Like other ratios in electronic engineering and related fields, the SINR is often expressed in decibels or dB.

== Propagation model ==
To develop a mathematical model for estimating the SINR, a suitable mathematical model is needed to represent the propagation of the incoming signal and the interfering signals. A common model approach is to assume the propagation model consists of a random component and non-random (or deterministic) component.

The deterministic component seeks to capture how a signal decays or attenuates as it travels a medium such as air, which is done by introducing a path-loss or attenuation function. A common choice for the path-loss function is a simple power-law. For example, if a signal travels from point x to point y, then it decays by a factor given by the path-loss function

$$\ell(|x-y|)=  |x-y|^\alpha$$,

where the path-loss exponent α>2, and |x-y| denotes the distance between point y of the user and the signal source at point x. Although this model suffers from a singularity (when x=y), its simple nature results in it often being used due to the relatively tractable models it gives. Exponential functions are sometimes used to model fast decaying signals.

The random component of the model entails representing multipath fading of the signal, which is caused by signals colliding with and reflecting off various obstacles such as buildings. This is incorporated into the model by introducing a random variable with some probability distribution. The probability distribution is chosen depending on the type of fading model and include Rayleigh, Rician, log-normal shadow (or shadowing), and Nakagami.

== SINR model ==
The propagation model leads to a model for the SINR. Consider a collection of $n$ base stations located at points $x_1$ to $x_n$ in the plane or 3D space. Then for a user located at, say $x=0$, then the SINR for a signal coming from base station, say, $x_i$, is given by

$$\mathrm{SINR}(x_i) {{=}} \frac{\frac{F_i}{\ell(|x_i|)}}{\sum_{j\neq i} \left[\frac{F_j}{\ell(|x_j|)}\right] +N}$$,

where $F_i$ are fading random variables of some distribution. Under the simple power-law path-loss model becomes

$$\mathrm{SINR}(x_i) {{=}} \frac{\frac{F_i}{|x_i|^{\alpha}}}{\sum_{j\neq i} \frac{F_j}{|x_j|^{\alpha}} +N}$$.

== Stochastic geometry models ==
In wireless networks, the factors that contribute to the SINR are often random (or appear random) including the signal propagation and the positioning of network transmitters and receivers. Consequently, in recent years this has motivated research in developing tractable stochastic geometry models in order to estimate the SINR in wireless networks. The related field of continuum percolation theory has also been used to derive bounds on the SINR in wireless networks.

== See also ==
- Signal-to-noise ratio
- Stochastic geometry models of wireless networks
- Continuum percolation theory
