= Point process operation =

Function that transforms a point process

In probability and statistics, a point process operation or point process transformation is a type of mathematical operation performed on a random object known as a point process, which are often used as mathematical models of phenomena that can be represented as points randomly located in space. These operations can be purely random, deterministic or both, and are used to construct new point processes, which can be then also used as mathematical models. The operations may include removing or thinning points from a point process, combining or superimposing multiple point processes into one point process or transforming the underlying space of the point process into another space. Point process operations and the resulting point processes are used in the theory of point processes and related fields such as stochastic geometry and spatial statistics.

One point process that gives particularly convenient results under random point process operations is the Poisson point process, The Poisson point process often exhibits a type of mathematical closure such that when a point process operation is applied to some Poisson point process, then provided some conditions on the point process operation, the resulting process will be often another Poisson point process operation, hence it is often used as a mathematical model.

Point process operations have been studied in the mathematical limit as the number of random point process operations applied approaches infinity. This had led to convergence theorems of point process operations, which have their origins in the pioneering work of Conny Palm in 1940s and later Aleksandr Khinchin in the 1950s and 1960s who both studied point processes on the real line, in the context of studying the arrival of phone calls and queueing theory in general. Provided that the original point process and the point process operation meet certain mathematical conditions, then as point process operations are applied to the process, then often the resulting point process will behave stochastically more like a Poisson point process if it has a non-random mean measure, which gives the average number of points of the point process located in some region. In other words, in the limit as the number of operations applied approaches infinity, the point process will converge in distribution (or weakly) to a Poisson point process or, if its measure is a random measure, to a Cox point process. Convergence results, such as the Palm-Khinchin theorem for renewal processes, are then also used to justify the use of the Poisson point process as a mathematical of various phenomena.

== Point process notation ==
Point processes are mathematical objects that can be used to represent collections of points randomly scattered on some underlying mathematical space. They have a number of interpretations, which is reflected by the various types of point process notation. For example, if a point $\textstyle x$ belongs to or is a member of a point process, denoted by $\textstyle {N}$, then this can be written as:

$$\textstyle x\in {N},$$

and represents the point process as a random set. Alternatively, the number of points of $\textstyle {N}$ located in some Borel set $\textstyle B$ is often written as:

$$\textstyle {N}(B),$$

which reflects a random measure interpretation for point processes.

A point process needs to be defined on an underlying mathematical space. Often this space is d-dimensional Euclidean space denoted here by $\textstyle \textbf{R}^{ d}$, although point processes can be defined on more abstract mathematical spaces.

== Examples of operations ==
To develop suitable models with point processes in stochastic geometry, spatial statistics and related fields, there are number of useful transformations that can be performed on point processes including: thinning, superposition, mapping (or transformation of space), clustering, and random displacement.

=== Thinning ===
The thinning operation entails using some predefined rule to remove points from a point process $\textstyle {N}$ to form a new point process $\textstyle {N}_p$. These thinning rules may be deterministic, that is, not random, which is the case for one of the simplest rules known as $\textstyle p$-thinning: each point of $\textstyle {N}$ is independently removed (or kept) with some probability $\textstyle p$ (or $\textstyle 1-p$). This rule may be generalized by introducing a non-negative function $\textstyle p(x)\leq 1$ in order to define the located-dependent $\textstyle p(x)$-thinning where now the probability of a point being removed is $\textstyle p(x)$ and is dependent on where the point of $\textstyle {N}$ is located on the underlying space. A further generalization is to have the thinning probability $\textstyle p$ random itself.

These three operations are all types of independent thinning, which means the interaction between points has no effect on the where a point is removed (or kept). Another generalization involves dependent thinning where points of the point process are removed (or kept) depending on their location in relation to other points of the point process. Thinning can be used to create new point processes such as hard-core processes where points do not exist (due to thinning) within a certain radius of each point in the thinned point process.

=== Superposition ===
The superposition operation is used to combine two or more point processes together onto one underlying mathematical space or state space. If there is a countable set or collection of point processes $\textstyle {N}_1,{N}_2\dots$ with mean measures $\textstyle \Lambda_1,\Lambda_2,\dots$, then their superposition

$${N}=\bigcup_{i=1}^{\infty}{N}_i,$$

also forms a point process. In this expression the superposition operation is denoted by a set union), which implies the random set interpretation of point processes; see Point process notation for more information.

==== Poisson point process case ====
In the case where each $\textstyle {N}_i$ is a Poisson point process, then the resulting process $\textstyle {N}$ is also a Poisson point process with mean intensity

$$\Lambda=\sum\limits_{i=1}^{\infty}\Lambda_i.$$

=== Clustering ===
The point operation known as clustering entails replacing every point $\textstyle x$ in a given point process $\textstyle {N}$ with a cluster of points $\textstyle N^x$. Each cluster is also a point process, but with a finite number of points. The union of all the clusters forms a cluster point process

$${N}_c=\bigcup_{x\in{N}}N^x.$$

Often is it assumed that the clusters $\textstyle N^x$ are all sets of finite points with each set being independent and identically distributed. Furthermore, if the original point process $\textstyle {N}$ has a constant intensity $\textstyle \lambda$, then the intensity of the cluster point process $\textstyle {N}_c$ will be

$$\lambda_c= c \lambda,$$

where the constant $\textstyle c$ is the mean of number of points in each $\textstyle N^x$.

=== Random displacement and translation ===
A mathematical model may require randomly moving points of a point process from some locations to other locations on the underlying mathematical space. This point process operation is referred to as random displacement or translation. If each point in the process is displaced or translated independently to other all other points in the process, then the operation forms an independent displacement or translation. It is usually assume that all the random translations have a common probability distribution; hence the displacements form a set of independent and identically distributed random vectors in the underlying mathematical space.

Applying random displacements or translations to point processes may be used as mathematical models for mobility of objects in, for example, ecology or wireless networks.

==== Displacement theorem ====
The result known as the Displacement theorem effectively says that the random independent displacement of points of a Poisson point process (on the same underlying space) forms another Poisson point process.

=== Transformation of space ===
Another property that is considered useful is the ability to map a point process from one underlying space to another space. For example, a point process defined on the plane R^{2} can be transformed from Cartesian coordinates to polar coordinates.

==== Mapping theorem ====
Provided that the mapping (or transformation) adheres to some conditions, then a result sometimes known as the Mapping theorem says that if the original process is a Poisson point process with some intensity measure, then the resulting mapped (or transformed) collection of points also forms a Poisson point process with another intensity measure.

== Convergence of point process operations ==
A point operation performed once on some point process can be, in general, performed again and again. In the theory of point processes, results have been derived to study the behaviour of the resulting point process, via convergence results, in the limit as the number of performed operations approaches infinity. For example, if each point in a general point process is repeatedly displaced in a certain random and independent manner, then the new point process, informally speaking, will more and more resemble a Poisson point process. Similar convergence results have been developed for the operations of thinning and superposition (with suitable rescaling of the underlying space).

== See also ==
- Point process
- Poisson point process
- Cox process
- Random measure
- Stochastic geometry
- Spatial statistics
- Queueing theory
- Probability distribution
