= Point process notation =

Mathematical notation used in probability and statistics

In probability and statistics, point process notation comprises the range of mathematical notation used to symbolically represent random objects known as point processes, which are used in related fields such as stochastic geometry, spatial statistics and continuum percolation theory and frequently serve as mathematical models of random phenomena, representable as points, in time, space or both.

The notation varies due to the histories of certain mathematical fields and the different interpretations of point processes, and borrows notation from mathematical areas of study such as measure theory and set theory.

== Interpretation of point processes ==
The notation, as well as the terminology, of point processes depends on their setting and interpretation as mathematical objects which under certain assumptions can be interpreted as random sequences of points, random sets of points or random counting measures.

=== Random sequences of points ===
In some mathematical frameworks, a given point process may be considered as a sequence of points with each point randomly positioned in d-dimensional Euclidean space R^{d} as well as some other more abstract mathematical spaces. In general, whether or not a random sequence is equivalent to the other interpretations of a point process depends on the underlying mathematical space, but this holds true for the setting of finite-dimensional Euclidean space R^{d}.

=== Random set of points ===
A point process is called simple if no two (or more points) coincide in location with probability one. Given that often point processes are simple and the order of the points does not matter, a collection of random points can be considered as a random set of points The theory of random sets was independently developed by David Kendall and Georges Matheron. In terms of being considered as a random set, a sequence of random points is a random closed set if the sequence has no accumulation points with probability one

A point process is often denoted by a single letter, for example ${N}$, and if the point process is considered as a random set, then the corresponding notation:

$$x\in {N},$$

is used to denote that a random point $x$ is an element of (or belongs to) the point process ${N}$. The theory of random sets can be applied to point processes owing to this interpretation, which alongside the random sequence interpretation has resulted in a point process being written as:

$$\{x_1, x_2,\dots \}=\{x\}_i,$$

which highlights its interpretation as either a random sequence or random closed set of points. Furthermore, sometimes an uppercase letter denotes the point process, while a lowercase denotes a point from the process, so, for example, the point $\textstyle x$ (or $\textstyle x_i$) belongs to or is a point of the point process $\textstyle X$, or with set notation, $\textstyle x\in X$.

=== Random measures ===
To denote the number of points of ${N}$ located in some Borel set $B$, it is sometimes written

$$\Phi(B) =\#( B \cap {N}),$$

where $\Phi(B)$ is a random variable and $\#$ is a counting measure, which gives the number of points in some set. In this mathematical expression the point process is denoted by:

$${N}$$.

On the other hand, the symbol:

$$\Phi$$

represents the number of points of ${N}$ in $B$. In the context of random measures, one can write:

$$\Phi(B)=n$$

to denote that there is the set $B$ that contains $n$ points of ${N}$. In other words, a point process can be considered as a random measure that assigns some non-negative integer-valued measure to sets. This interpretation has motivated a point process being considered just another name for a random counting measure and the techniques of random measure theory offering another way to study point processes, which also induces the use of the various notations used in integration and measure theory. (Note: As discussed in Chapter 1 of Stoyan, Kendall and Mechke, varying integral notation in general applies to all integrals here and elsewhere.)

== Dual notation ==
The different interpretations of point processes as random sets and counting measures is captured with the often used notation in which:

- ${N}$ denotes a set of random points.
- ${N}(B)$ denotes a random variable that gives the number of points of ${N}$ in $B$ (hence it is a random counting measure).

Denoting the counting measure again with $\#$, this dual notation implies:

$${N}(B) =\#(B \cap {N}).$$

== Sums ==
If $f$ is some measurable function on R^{d}, then the sum of $f(x)$ over all the points $x$ in ${N}$ can be written in a number of ways such as:

$$f(x_1) + f(x_2)+ \cdots$$

which has the random sequence appearance, or with set notation as:

$$\sum_{x\in {N}}f(x)$$

or, equivalently, with integration notation as:

$$\int_{\textbf{R}^d} f(x) {N}(dx)$$

which puts an emphasis on the interpretation of ${N}$ being a random counting measure. An alternative integration notation may be used to write this integral as:

$$\int_{\textbf{R}^d} f \, d{N}$$

The dual interpretation of point processes is illustrated when writing the number of ${N}$ points in a set $B$ as:

$${N}(B)= \sum_{x\in {N}}1_B(x)$$

where the indicator function $1_B(x) =1$ if the point $x$ is exists in $B$ and zero otherwise, which in this setting is also known as a Dirac measure. In this expression the random measure interpretation is on the left-hand side while the random set notation is used is on the right-hand side.

== Expectations ==
The average or expected value of a sum of functions over a point process is written as:

$$E\left[\sum_{x\in {N}}f(x)\right] \qquad \text{or} \qquad  \int_{\textbf{N}}\sum_{x\in {N}}f(x) P(d{N}),$$

where (in the random measure sense) $P$ is an appropriate probability measure defined on the space of counting measures $\textbf{N}$. The expected value of ${N}(B)$ can be written as:

$$E[{N}(B)]=E\left( \sum_{x\in {N}}1_B(x)\right) \qquad \text{or}  \qquad  \int_{\textbf{N}}\sum_{x\in {N}}1_B(x) P(d{N}).$$

which is also known as the first moment measure of ${N}$. The expectation of such a random sum, known as a shot noise process in the theory of point processes, can be calculated with Campbell's theorem.

== Uses in other fields ==
Point processes are employed in other mathematical and statistical disciplines, hence the notation may be used in fields such stochastic geometry, spatial statistics or continuum percolation theory, and areas which use the methods and theory from these fields.

== See also ==
- Mathematical Alphanumeric Symbols
- Mathematical notation
- Notation in probability
- Table of mathematical symbols
