= Complete spatial randomness =

Complete spatial randomness (CSR) describes a point process whereby point events occur within a given study area in a completely random fashion. It is synonymous with a homogeneous spatial Poisson process. Such a process is modeled using only one parameter $\rho$, i.e. the density of points within the defined area. The term complete spatial randomness is commonly used in Applied Statistics in the context of examining certain point patterns, whereas in most other statistical contexts it is referred to the concept of a spatial Poisson process.

== Model ==
Data in the form of a set of points, irregularly distributed within a region of space, arise in many different contexts; examples include locations of trees in a forest, of nests of birds, of nuclei in tissue, of ill people in a population at risk. We call any such data-set a spatial point pattern and refer to the locations as events, to distinguish these from arbitrary points of the region in question. The hypothesis of complete spatial randomness for a spatial point pattern asserts that the number of events in any region follows a Poisson distribution with given mean count per uniform subdivision. The events of a pattern are independently and uniformly distributed over space; in other words, the events are equally likely to occur anywhere and do not interact with each other.

"Uniform" is used in the sense of following a uniform probability distribution across the study region, not in the sense of “evenly” dispersed across the study region. There are no interactions amongst the events, and the intensity of events does not vary over the plane. For example, the independence assumption would be violated if the existence of one event either encouraged or inhibited the occurrence of other events in the neighborhood.

== Distribution ==
The probability of finding exactly $k$ points within the area $V$ with event density $\rho$ is therefore:

$$P(k,\rho,V) = \frac{(V\rho)^k e^{-(V\rho) }}{k!} . \,\!$$

The first moment of which, the average number of points in the area, is simply $\rho V$. This value is intuitive as it is the Poisson rate parameter.

The probability of locating the $N^{\mathrm{th}}$ neighbor of any given point, at some radial distance $r$ is:

$$P_N(r) = \frac{D}{(N-1)!}  {\lambda}^N r^{DN-1} e^{- \lambda r^D} ,$$

where $D$ is the number of dimensions, $\lambda$ is a density-dependent parameter given by $\lambda = \frac{\rho \pi ^{\frac{D}{2}}}{\Gamma (\frac{D}{2} +1)}$ and $\Gamma$ is the gamma function, which when its argument is integer, is simply the factorial function - i.e. $\Gamma(n+1) = n!$ for integral $n$.

The expected value of $P_N(r)$ can be derived via the use of the gamma function using statistical moments. The first moment is the mean distance between randomly distributed particles in $D$ dimensions.

== Applications ==
The study of CSR is essential for the comparison of measured point data from experimental sources. As a statistical testing method, the test for CSR has many applications in the social sciences and in astronomical examinations. CSR is often the standard against which data sets are tested. Roughly described one approach to test the CSR hypothesis is the following:

1. Use statistics that are a function of the distance from every event to the next nearest event.
2. Firstly focus on a specific event and formulate a method for testing whether the event and the next nearest event are significantly close (or distant).
3. Next consider all events and formulate a method for testing whether the average distance from every event to the next nearest event is significantly short (or long).

In cases where computing test statistics analytically is difficult, numerical methods, such as the Monte Carlo method simulation are employed, by simulating a stochastic process a large number of times.
