= Boolean model (probability theory) =

Realization of Boolean model with random-radii discs.

For statistics in probability theory, the Boolean-Poisson model or simply Boolean model for a random subset of the plane (or higher dimensions, analogously) is one of the simplest and most tractable models in stochastic geometry. Take a Poisson point process of rate $\lambda$ in the plane and make each point be the center of a random set; the resulting union of overlapping sets is a realization of the Boolean model ${\mathcal B}$. More precisely, the parameters are $\lambda$ and a probability distribution on compact sets; for each point $\xi$ of the Poisson point process we pick a set $C_\xi$ from the distribution, and then define ${\mathcal B}$ as the union $\cup_\xi (\xi + C_\xi)$ of translated sets.

To illustrate tractability with one simple formula, the mean density of ${\mathcal B}$ equals $1 - \exp(- \lambda A)$ where $\Gamma$ denotes the area of $C_\xi$ and $A=\operatorname{E} (\Gamma).$ The classical theory of stochastic geometry develops many further formulae.

As related topics, the case of constant-sized discs is the basic model of continuum percolation and the low-density Boolean models serve as a first-order approximations in the study of extremes in many models.
