= List of things named after Siméon Denis Poisson =

These are things named after Siméon Denis Poisson (1781 – 1840), a French mathematician.

== Physics ==
- Poisson’s Equations (thermodynamics)
- Poisson’s Equation (rotational motion)
- Schrödinger–Poisson equation
- Vlasov–Poisson equation

Hamiltonian mechanics

- Poisson bracket

Electrostatics

- Poisson equation
  - Euler–Poisson–Darboux equation
  - Poisson–Boltzmann equation
  - Screened Poisson equation

Optics

- Poisson's spot

Elasticity

- Poisson's ratio

== Mathematics ==
- Dirichlet–Poisson problem
- Poisson algebra
  - Poisson superalgebra
- Poisson boundary
- Poisson bracket, see Hamiltonian mechanics header
- Poisson games
- Poisson manifold
- Poisson ring
  - Poisson supermanifold
- Poisson–Charlier polynomials
- Poisson-Hopf algebra
- Poisson–Mellin–Newton cycle
- Poisson–Lie group

Probability theory

- Boolean-Poisson model
- Poisson bootstrap
- Poisson distribution
  - Compound Poisson distribution
  - Conditional Poisson distribution
  - Conway–Maxwell–Poisson distribution
  - Displaced Poisson distribution
  - Geometric Poisson distribution
  - Poisson binomial distribution
  - Poisson clumping
  - Super-Poissonian distribution
- Poisson process
  - Compound Poisson process
  - Mixed Poisson process
- Poisson sampling
- Poisson scatter theorem
- Poisson random measure
  - Poisson-type random measure
- Poisson regression
  - Fixed-effect Poisson model
- Poisson limit theorem
- Poisson zeros

=== Mathematical analysis ===
- Poisson's (differential) equation, Poisson (differential) equation; see Electrostatics header
  - Poisson solver, numerical software designed to solve Poisson's differential equation
  - Poisson differential operator
  - Dirichlet–Poisson problem
  - Discrete Poisson equation
- Poisson kernel
  - Poisson integral formula
- Poisson–Jensen formula

Fourier analysis

- Poisson summation formula (Poisson resummation)

Wavelet theory

- Poisson wavelet

== Computer science ==
- Poisson disk
- Poisson image editing

== Other ==
- Advanced Poisson-Boltzmann Solver
- Poisson (crater) on the Moon
- Collège Denis Poisson in Pithiviers
