= Mixed binomial process =

Special point process in probability

A mixed binomial process is a special point process in probability theory. They naturally arise from restrictions of (mixed) Poisson processes bounded intervals.

== Definition ==
Let $P$ be a probability distribution and let $X_i, X_2, \dots$ be i.i.d. random variables with distribution $P$. Let $K$ be a random variable taking a.s. (almost surely) values in $\mathbb N= \{0,1,2, \dots \}$. Assume that $K, X_1, X_2, \dots$ are independent and let $\delta_x$ denote the Dirac measure on the point $x$.

Then a random measure $\xi$ is called a mixed binomial process iff it has a representation as

$$\xi= \sum_{i=0}^K \delta_{X_i}$$

This is equivalent to $\xi$ conditionally on $\{ K =n \}$ being a binomial process based on $n$ and $P$.

== Properties ==
=== Laplace transform ===
Conditional on $K=n$, a mixed Binomial processe has the Laplace transform

$$\mathcal L(f)= \left( \int \exp(-f(x))\;  P(\mathrm dx)\right)^n$$

for any positive, measurable function $f$.

=== Restriction to bounded sets ===
For a point process $\xi$ and a bounded measurable set $B$ define the restriction of$\xi$ on $B$ as

$$\xi_B(\cdot )= \xi(B \cap \cdot)$$.

Mixed binomial processes are stable under restrictions in the sense that if $\xi$ is a mixed binomial process based on $P$ and $K$, then $\xi_B$ is a mixed binomial process based on

$$P_B(\cdot)= \frac{P(B \cap \cdot)}{P(B)}$$

and some random variable $\tilde K$.

Also if $\xi$ is a Poisson process or a mixed Poisson process, then $\xi_B$ is a mixed binomial process.

== Examples ==
Poisson-type random measures are a family of three random counting measures which are closed under restriction to a subspace, i.e. closed under thinning, that are examples of mixed binomial processes. They are the only distributions in the canonical non-negative power series family of distributions to possess this property and include the Poisson distribution, negative binomial distribution, and binomial distribution. Poisson-type (PT) random measures include the Poisson random measure, negative binomial random measure, and binomial random measure.
