= Nu-transform =

In the theory of stochastic processes, a ν-transform is an operation that transforms a measure or a point process into a different point process. Intuitively the ν-transform randomly relocates the points of the point process, with the type of relocation being dependent on the position of each point.

== Definition ==
=== For measures ===
Let $\delta_x$ denote the Dirac measure on the point $x$ and let $\mu$ be a simple point measure on $S$. This means that

$$\mu= \sum_k \delta_{s_k}$$

for distinct $s_k \in S$ and $\mu(B)< \infty$ for every bounded set $B$ in $S$. Further, let $\nu$ be a Markov kernel from $S$ to $T$.

Let $\tau_k$ be independent random elements with distribution $\nu_{s_k}=\nu(s_k,\cdot)$. Then the point process

$$\zeta = \sum_{k} \delta_{\tau_k}$$

is called the ν-transform of the measure $\mu$ if it is locally finite, meaning that $\zeta(B) < \infty$ for every bounded set $B$

=== For point processes ===
For a point process $\xi$, a second point process $\zeta$ is called a $\nu$-transform of $\xi$ if, conditional on $\{ \xi=\mu\}$, the point process $\zeta$ is a $\nu$-transform of $\mu$.

== Properties ==
=== Stability ===
If $\zeta$ is a Cox process directed by the random measure $\xi$, then the $\nu$-transform of $\zeta$ is again a Cox-process, directed by the random measure $\xi \cdot \nu$ (see Transition kernel#Composition of kernels)

Therefore, the $\nu$-transform of a Poisson process with intensity measure $\mu$ is a Cox process directed by a random measure with distribution $\mu \cdot \nu$.

=== Laplace transform ===
It $\zeta$ is a $\nu$-transform of $\xi$, then the Laplace transform of $\zeta$ is given by

$$\mathcal L_{\zeta}(f)= \exp \left( \int \log \left[ \int \exp(-f(t)) \mu_s(\mathrm dt)\right] \xi(\mathrm ds)\right)$$

for all bounded, positive and measurable functions $f$.
