= Intensity =

Intensity may refer to:

== In colloquial use ==
- Strength (disambiguation)
- Amplitude
- Level (disambiguation)
- Magnitude (disambiguation)

== In physical sciences ==
=== Physics ===
- Intensity (physics), power per unit area (W/m^{2})
- Field strength of electric, magnetic, or electromagnetic fields (V/m, T, etc.)
- Intensity (heat transfer), radiant heat flux per unit area per unit solid angle (W·m^{−2}·sr^{−1})
- Electric current, whose value is sometimes called current intensity in older books

=== Optics ===
- Radiant intensity, power per unit solid angle (W/sr)
- Luminous intensity, luminous flux per unit solid angle (lm/sr or cd)
- Irradiance, power per unit area (W/m^{2})

=== Astronomy ===
- Radiance, power per unit solid angle per unit projected source area (W·sr^{−1}·m^{−2})

=== Seismology ===
- Mercalli intensity scale, a measure of earthquake impact
- Japan Meteorological Agency seismic intensity scale, a measure of earthquake impact
- Peak ground acceleration, a measure of earthquake acceleration (g or m/s^{2})

=== Acoustics ===
- Sound intensity, sound power per unit area

== Other uses ==
- Value intensity in philosophy and ethics
- In video luminous emittance, the luminous flux per unit area (lm/m^{2} or lux)
- Energy intensity, an economic measure of energy consumed per unit of GDP (J/$, etc.)
- Carbon intensity, any of several measures of release of carbon into the environment
- Floor area ratio, the ratio of the total floor area of buildings on a certain location to the size of the land of that location, or the zoning limit imposed on such a ratio
- Intensity (measure theory), the average value a measure assigns to an interval of length one
- Exercise intensity, a measure of how much work is done during exercise (% of max heart rate)
- Intensity (novel), a 1995 novel by Dean Koontz
  - Intensity (film), a 1997 made-for-TV movie based on the novel
- Intensity (Charles Earland album), 1972
- Intensity (Art Pepper album), 1960
- Intensity (John Klemmer album), 1973
- Intensity!, a 1999 album by The Bambi Molesters
- Intensity (video game), a 1988 video game.
- "Intensity", a song by Linda Perhacs from the album The Soul of All Natural Things

== See also ==
- Brightness
