= PMN J0948+0022 =

Narrow-line Seyfert galaxy located in the constellation Sextans

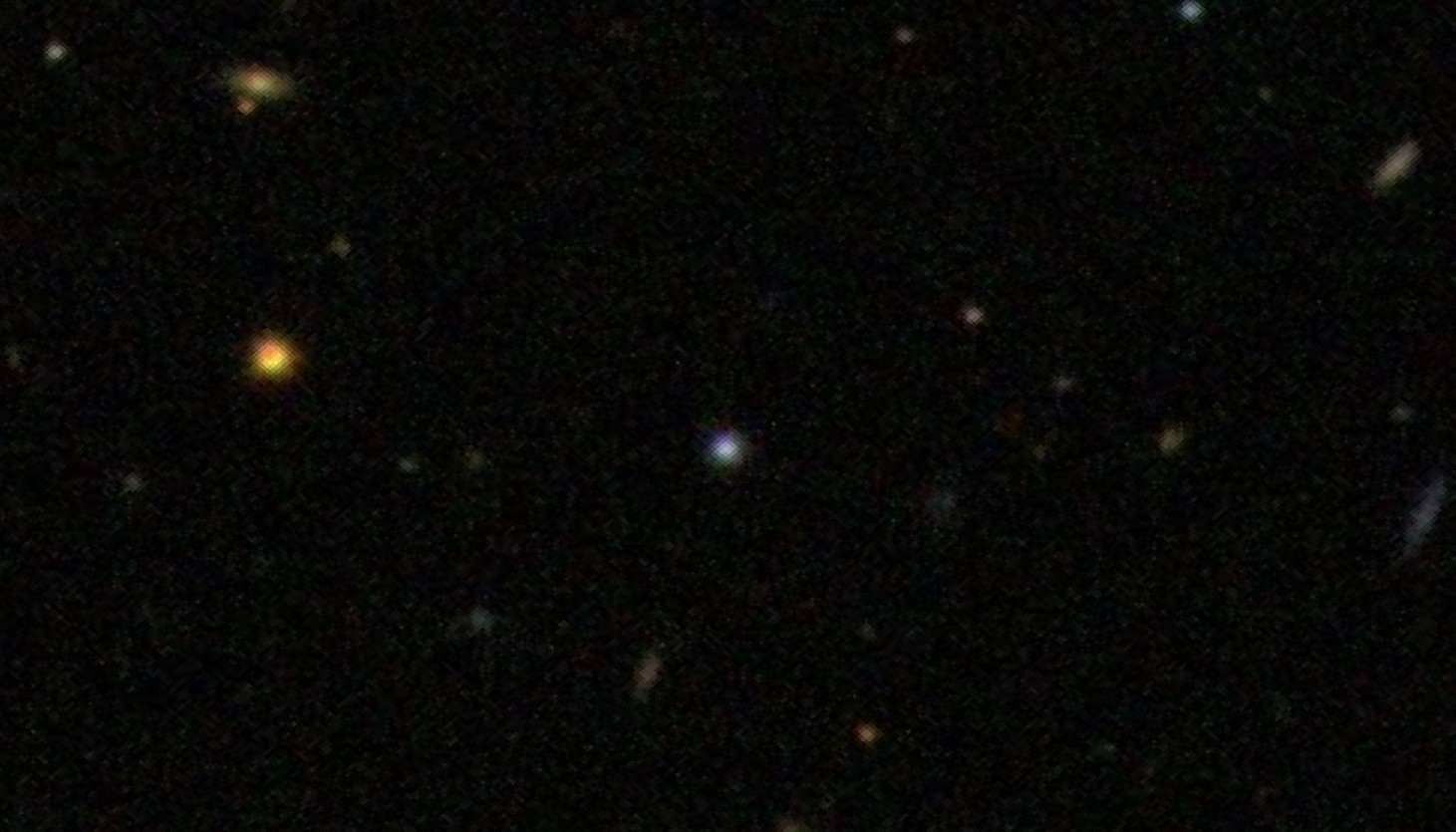
- SDSS image of the narrow-line Seyfert galaxy PMN J0948+0022.

Observation data (J2000.0 epoch)
- Constellation: Sextans
- Right ascension: 09^{h} 48^{m} 57.32^{s}
- Declination: +00° 22′ 25.56″
- Redshift: 0.583844
- Heliocentric radial velocity: 175,032 km/s
- Distance: 5.780 Gly
- Apparent magnitude (V): 18.61
- Apparent magnitude (B): 18.85

Characteristics
- Type: FSRQ NLSy 1
- Notable features: Gamma-ray emitting Seyfert galaxy

Other designations
- SDSS J094857.31+002225.5, NVSS J094857+002225, IERS B0946+006, RX J0948.8+0022, 2PBC J0948.9+0021, CGRaBS J0948+0022

PMN J0948+0022 is a narrow-line Seyfert 1 galaxy and quasar located 5.7 billion light years away in the constellation of Sextans. It has a redshift of (z) 0.5846, and is classified as radio-loud with a flat and inverted radio spectrum. First discovered in 2002 in the SDSS survey, this object is known to emit gamma-rays, and as such belongs to a new classification of gamma-ray emitting active galactic nuclei along with 1H 0323+342, PKS 2004-447 and PKS 1502+036.

== Description ==
PMN J0948+0022 is constantly in an active state, in terms of emitting gamma-rays. A high energy outburst in July 2010 was detected by the Large Area Telescope aboard the Fermi Gamma-ray Space Telescope. Two flares were detected during observations in 2011. A new gramma-ray flare was emitted by the object on January 1, 2013 when a peak flux was detected in the 0.1-100 GeV energy range, reaching (155 ± 31) × 10^{−8} ph cm^{−2} s^{−1} making it the most powerful then observed. A quasi-simultaneous flare was observed on December 30, 2012, detected in ultraviolet, optical and X-rays. In 2025 it displayed a radio flare.

The radio structure of PMN J0948+0022 is extended on kiloparsec-scales. Radio imaging made by FIRST showed there are two components, located north and south, clearly elongated on two sides and centered at the location of the radio core. There is a powerful relativistic jet pointing in the direction of Earth. This jet's viewing angle is constantly fixed to 3°, while on parsec-scales the jet has an opening angle of 41° ± 1°. The Very Long Baseline Array found strong and weak components in PMN J0948+0022 at 15, 5 and 8.4 GHz, while a single component was only found unresolved by the Very Large Array (VLA). In 2019 new radio imaging by the VLA detected a new northern component located 18° from the nucleus. This component is compact, with a separation of 9.1 arcseconds and is elongated in a different direction.

Polarimetry data taken with the Perkins Telescope at Lowell Observatory discovered PMN J0948+0022 displays both optical polarization and rapid microvariability, suggesting blazar-like behavior. Moderate but significant variability was detected in addition, with the percentage of polarization reaching 12.31% ± 1.21% and the electric vector position angle varies. On short timescales PMN J048+0022 was also extremely variable with its minimum brightness increasing from 18.69 ± 0.02 R to a maximum brightness of 17.92 ± 0.02 R within 4 hours and 45 minutes. Subsequently its brightness declined rapidly from 18.13 ± 0.04 R to 18.96 ± 0.02 R in 3 hours. The timescale doubled to 4.39 ± 0.19 hr, then halved to 3.60 ± 0.23 hr.

PMN J0948+0022 also displays intraday variability. On April 26, 2020 it entered a new intraday variability phase detected by the Wide-field Infrared Survey Explorer. During the observations, the source begin to fade over a one day period, to the point it became darkened. According to linear fits on both light curves, a magnitude change was calculated as 0.73 and 0.62 magnitude per day.

The central supermassive black hole in PMN J0948+0022 has an estimated mass of 1.61 × 10^{7} M_{☉} based on a radius-luminosity relationship proposed by Du and Wang in 2019. The accretion rate is Ṁ = 93 and combined with its black hole mass, this confirms PMN J0948+0022 as a super-Eddington accreting galaxy located at a high redshift.
