= Decomposable measure =

In mathematics, a decomposable measure (also known as a strictly localizable measure) is a measure that is a disjoint union of finite measures. This is a generalization of σ-finite measures, which are the same as those that are a disjoint union of countably many finite measures. There are several theorems in measure theory such as the Radon–Nikodym theorem that are not true for arbitrary measures but are true for σ-finite measures. Several such theorems remain true for the more general class of decomposable measures. This extra generality is not used much as most decomposable measures that occur in practice are σ-finite.

== Examples ==
- Counting measure on an uncountable measure space with all subsets measurable is a decomposable measure that is not σ-finite. Fubini's theorem and Tonelli's theorem hold for σ-finite measures but can fail for this measure.
- Counting measure on an uncountable measure space with not all subsets measurable is generally not a decomposable measure.
- The one-point space of measure infinity is not decomposable.

== Bibliography ==
- Hewitt, Edwin; Stromberg, Karl (1965), Real and Abstract Analysis. A Modern Treatment of the Theory of Functions of a Real Variable, Graduate Texts in Mathematics, vol. 25, Berlin, Heidelberg, New York: Springer-Verlag, ISBN 978-0-387-90138-1, MR 0188387, Zbl 0137.03202
- Fremlin, D.H. (2016). Measure Theory, Volume 2: Broad Foundations (Hardback ed.). Torres Fremlin. Second printing.
