= PG 1216+069 =

Quasar in the constellation Virgo

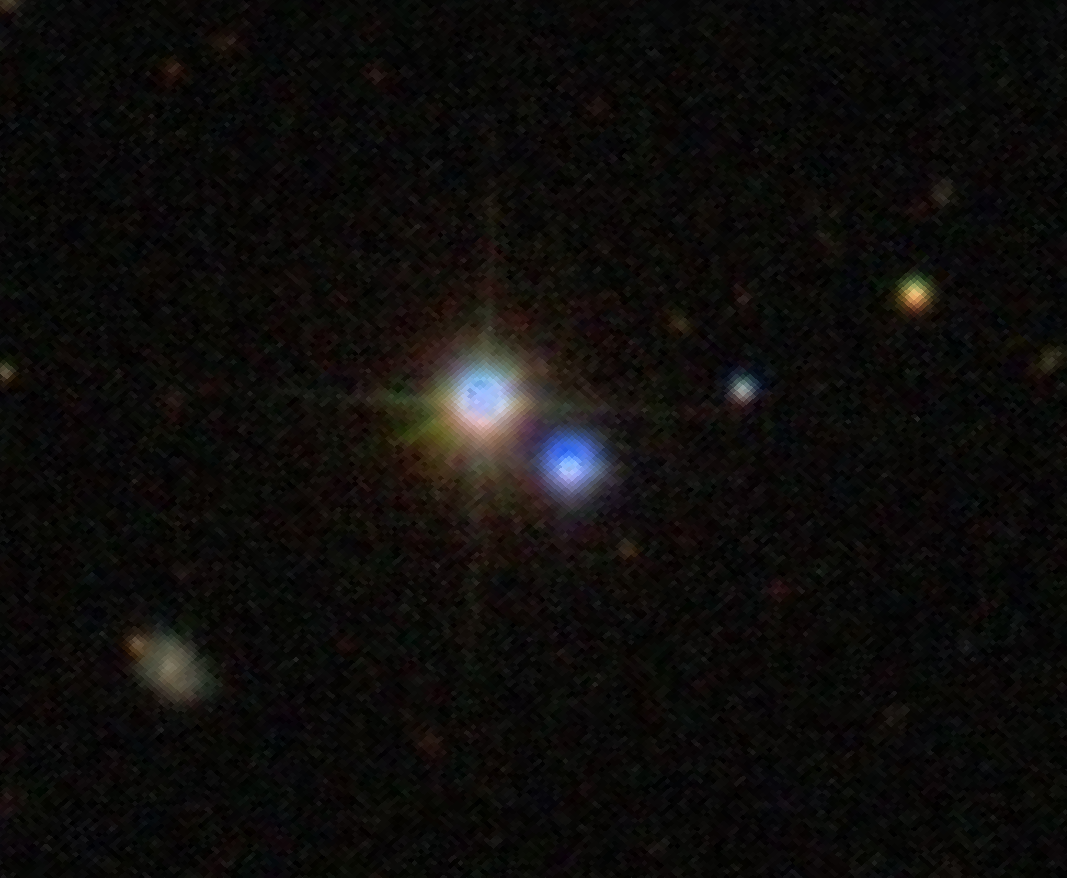
- SDSS image of PG 1216+069.

Observation data (J2000.0 epoch)
- Constellation: Virgo
- Right ascension: 12^{h} 19^{m} 20.93^{s}
- Declination: +06° 38′ 38.49″
- Redshift: 0.331300
- Heliocentric radial velocity: 99,321 km/s ± 90
- Distance: 3.822 Gly
- Apparent magnitude (V): 15.65
- Apparent magnitude (B): 15.68

Characteristics
- Type: Elliptical Sy1
- Size: ~405,500 ly (124.32 kpc) (estimated)

Other designations
- 2MASS J12192094+0638384, PG 1216+069, RBS 1097, RX J1219.3+0638, SDSS J121920.93+063838.5

PG 1216+069 is a quasar and also a Seyfert 1 galaxy located in the constellation of Virgo. The redshift of the object is (z) 0.331 and it was first discovered by astronomers from the Bright Quasar Survey (BQS) in June 1983. It has also been classified as a radio intermediate quasar (RIQ) in literature.

== Description ==
PG 1216+069 is radio-quiet. It is hosted by a large elliptical galaxy, based on Hubble Space Telescope (HST) imaging, which has an absolute magnitude of around -20.9. It is also surrounded by a halo structure. Two close companions are found to be located from the galaxy by 13.6 and 20.4 kiloparsecs respectively. A subdampened Lyman-alpha absorption line system was located towards the quasar.

The radio structure of PG 1216+069 can be considered as compact. When imaged with the Very Long Baseline Array (VLBA), it has a compact radio core with a brightness temperature of >10^{8} Kelvin, with its flux density peaking at around 1.04 mJy frequencies. Radio imaging made with Very Long Baseline Interferometry (VLBI) found the component radio spectrum is flat, with the spectral shape being described as inverted. A slightly extended structure is found based on radio mapping at 5 and 8.4 GHz frequencies.

A supermassive black hole mass has been estimated for PG 1216+069, and is estimated to be 8.30 ± 0.12 M_{☉}. There have also been detections of doubly ionized silicon absorption at high velocities towards the quasar, spread out evenly across two components that are separating from each other at 234 kilometers per second.
