= Cox process =

Poisson point process

In probability theory, a Cox process, also known as a doubly stochastic Poisson process, is a point process which is a generalization of a Poisson process where the intensity that varies across the underlying mathematical space (often space or time) is itself a stochastic process. The process is named after the statistician David Cox, who first published the model in 1955.

Cox processes are used to generate simulations of spike trains (the sequence of action potentials generated by a neuron), and also in financial mathematics where they produce a "useful framework for modeling prices of financial instruments in which credit risk is a significant factor."

== Definition ==
Let $\xi$ be a random measure.

A random measure $\eta$ is called a Cox process directed by $\xi$, if $\mathcal L(\eta \mid \xi=\mu)$ is a Poisson process with intensity measure $\mu$.

Here, $\mathcal L(\eta \mid \xi=\mu)$ is the conditional distribution of $\eta$, given $\{ \xi=\mu\}$.

== Laplace transform ==
If $\eta$ is a Cox process directed by $\xi$, then $\eta$ has the Laplace transform

$$\mathcal L_\eta(f)=\exp \left(- \int 1-\exp(-f(x))\; \xi(\mathrm dx)\right)$$

for any positive, measurable function $f$.

== See also ==
- Poisson hidden Markov model
- Doubly stochastic model
- Inhomogeneous Poisson process, where λ(t) is restricted to a deterministic function
- Ross's conjecture
- Gaussian process
- Mixed Poisson process
- Intensity of counting processes
- Dynamic contagion process
