= Transition kernel =

Mathematical function

In the mathematics of probability, a transition kernel or kernel is a function in mathematics that has different applications. Kernels can for example be used to define random measures or stochastic processes. The most important example of kernels are the Markov kernels.

== Definition ==
Let $(S, \mathcal S)$, $(T, \mathcal T)$ be two measurable spaces. A function

$$\kappa \colon S \times \mathcal T \to [0, +\infty]$$

is called a (transition) kernel from $S$ to $T$ if the following two conditions hold:

- For any fixed $B \in \mathcal T$, the mapping

$$s \mapsto \kappa(s,B)$$

is $\mathcal S/ \mathcal B([0, +\infty])$-measurable;

- For every fixed $s \in S$, the mapping

$$B \mapsto \kappa(s, B)$$

is a measure on $(T, \mathcal T)$.

== Classification of transition kernels ==
Transition kernels are usually classified by the measures they define. Those measures are defined as

$$\kappa_s \colon \mathcal T \to [0, + \infty]$$

with

$$\kappa_s(B)=\kappa(s,B)$$

for all $B \in \mathcal T$ and all $s \in S$. With this notation, the kernel $\kappa$ is called

- a substochastic kernel, sub-probability kernel or a sub-Markov kernel if all $\kappa_s$ are sub-probability measures
- a Markov kernel, stochastic kernel or probability kernel if all $\kappa_s$ are probability measures
- a finite kernel if all $\kappa_s$ are finite measures
- a $\sigma$-finite kernel if all $\kappa_s$ are $\sigma$-finite measures
- a $s$-finite kernel if $\kappa$ can be written as a countable sum of finite kernels (so that in particular, all $\kappa_s$ are $s$-finite measures).
- a uniformly $\sigma$-finite kernel if there are at most countably many measurable sets $B_1, B_2, \dots$ in $T$ with $\kappa_s(B_i) < \infty$ for all $s \in S$ and all $i \in \N$.

== Operations ==
In this section, let $(S, \mathcal S)$, $(T, \mathcal T)$ and $(U, \mathcal U)$ be measurable spaces and denote the product σ-algebra of $\mathcal S$ and $\mathcal T$ with $\mathcal S \otimes \mathcal T$

=== Product of kernels ===
==== Definition ====
Let $\kappa^1$ be a s-finite kernel from $S$ to $T$ and $\kappa^2$ be a s-finite kernel from $S \times T$ to $U$. Then the product $\kappa^1 \otimes \kappa^2$ of the two kernels is defined as

$$\kappa^1 \otimes \kappa^2 \colon S \times (\mathcal T \otimes \mathcal U) \to [0, \infty]$$
$$\kappa^1 \otimes \kappa^2(s,A)= \int_T \kappa^1(s, \mathrm d t) \int_U \kappa^2((s,t), \mathrm du) \mathbf 1_A(t,u)$$

for all $A \in \mathcal T \otimes \mathcal U$.

==== Properties and comments ====
The product of two kernels is a kernel from $S$ to $T \times U$. It is again a s-finite kernel and is a $\sigma$-finite kernel if $\kappa^1$ and $\kappa^2$ are $\sigma$-finite kernels. The product of kernels is also associative, meaning it satisfies

$$(\kappa^1 \otimes \kappa^2) \otimes \kappa^3= \kappa^1 \otimes (\kappa^2\otimes \kappa^3)$$

for any three suitable s-finite kernels $\kappa^1,\kappa^2,\kappa^3$.

The product is also well-defined if $\kappa^2$ is a kernel from $T$ to $U$. In this case, it is treated like a kernel from $S \times T$ to $U$ that is independent of $S$. This is equivalent to setting

$$\kappa((s,t),A):= \kappa(t,A)$$

for all $A \in \mathcal U$ and all $s \in S$.

=== Composition of kernels ===
==== Definition ====
Let $\kappa^1$ be a s-finite kernel from $S$ to $T$ and $\kappa^2$ a s-finite kernel from $S \times T$ to $U$. Then the composition $\kappa^1 \cdot \kappa^2$ of the two kernels is defined as

$$\kappa^1 \cdot \kappa^2 \colon  S \times \mathcal U \to [0, \infty]$$

$$(s, B) \mapsto \int_T \kappa^1(s, \mathrm dt) \int_U \kappa^2((s,t), \mathrm du) \mathbf 1_B(u)$$

for all $s \in S$ and all $B \in \mathcal U$.

==== Properties and comments ====
The composition is a kernel from $S$ to $U$ that is again s-finite. The composition of kernels is associative, meaning it satisfies

$$(\kappa^1 \cdot \kappa^2) \cdot \kappa^3= \kappa^1 \cdot (\kappa^2 \cdot  \kappa^3)$$

for any three suitable s-finite kernels $\kappa^1,\kappa^2,\kappa^3$. Just like the product of kernels, the composition is also well-defined if $\kappa^2$ is a kernel from $T$ to $U$.

An alternative notation is for the composition is $\kappa^1 \kappa^2$

== Kernels as operators ==
Let $\mathcal T^+, \mathcal S^+$ be the set of positive measurable functions on $(S, \mathcal S), (T, \mathcal T)$.

Every kernel $\kappa$ from $S$ to $T$ can be associated with a linear operator

$$A_\kappa \colon \mathcal T^+ \to \mathcal S^+$$

given by

$$(A_\kappa f)(s)= \int_T  \kappa (s, \mathrm dt)\; f(t).$$

The composition of these operators is compatible with the composition of kernels, meaning

$$A_{\kappa^1} A_{\kappa^2}= A_{\kappa^1 \cdot \kappa^2}$$
