= Dynamic contagion process =

Concept in mathematics

In applied probability, a dynamic contagion process is a point process with stochastic intensity that generalises the Hawkes process and Cox process with exponentially decaying shot noise intensity.

== See also ==
- Point process
- Cox process
- Doubly stochastic model
