= Binomial process =

Special point process in probability

A binomial process is a special point process in probability theory.

== Definition ==
Let $P$ be a probability distribution and $n$ be a fixed natural number. Let $X_1, X_2, \dots, X_n$ be i.i.d. random variables with distribution $P$, so $X_i \sim P$ for all $i \in \{1, 2, \dots, n \}$.

Then the binomial process based on n and P is the random measure

$$\xi= \sum_{i=1}^n \delta_{X_i},$$

where
$$\delta_{X_i(A)}=\begin{cases}1, &\text{if }X_i\in A,\\ 0, &\text{otherwise}.\end{cases}$$

== Properties ==
=== Name ===
The name of a binomial process is derived from the fact that for all measurable sets $A$ the random variable $\xi(A)$ follows a binomial distribution with parameters $P(A)$ and $n$:

$$\xi(A) \sim \operatorname{Bin}(n,P(A)).$$

=== Laplace-transform ===
The Laplace transform of a binomial process is given by

$$\mathcal L_{P,n}(f)= \left[ \int \exp(-f(x)) \mathrm P(dx) \right]^n$$

for all positive measurable functions $f$.

=== Intensity measure ===
The intensity measure $\operatorname{E}\xi$ of a binomial process $\xi$ is given by

$$\operatorname{E}\xi =n P.$$

== Generalizations ==
A generalization of binomial processes are mixed binomial processes. In these point processes, the number of points is not deterministic like it is with binomial processes, but is determined by a random variable $K$. Therefore, mixed binomial processes conditioned on $K=n$ are binomial process based on $n$ and $P$.

== Literature ==
- Kallenberg, Olav (2017). Random Measures, Theory and Applications. Switzerland: Springer. doi:10.1007/978-3-319-41598-7. ISBN 978-3-319-41596-3.
