= Sub-probability measure =

In the mathematical theory of probability and measure, a sub-probability measure is a measure that is closely related to probability measures. While probability measures always assign the value 1 to the underlying set, sub-probability measures assign a value lesser than or equal to 1 to the underlying set.

== Definition ==
Let $\mu$ be a measure on the measurable space $(X, \mathcal A)$.

Then $\mu$ is called a sub-probability measure if $\mu(X) \leq 1$.

== Properties ==
In measure theory, the following implications hold between measures: $\text{probability} \implies \text{sub-probability} \implies \text{finite} \implies \sigma\text{-finite}$

So every probability measure is a sub-probability measure, but the converse is not true. Also every sub-probability measure is a finite measure and a σ-finite measure, but the converse is again not true.

== See also ==
- Helly's selection theorem
- Helly–Bray theorem
