= PKS 2155−152 =

BL Lacertae object located in the constellation Capricornus

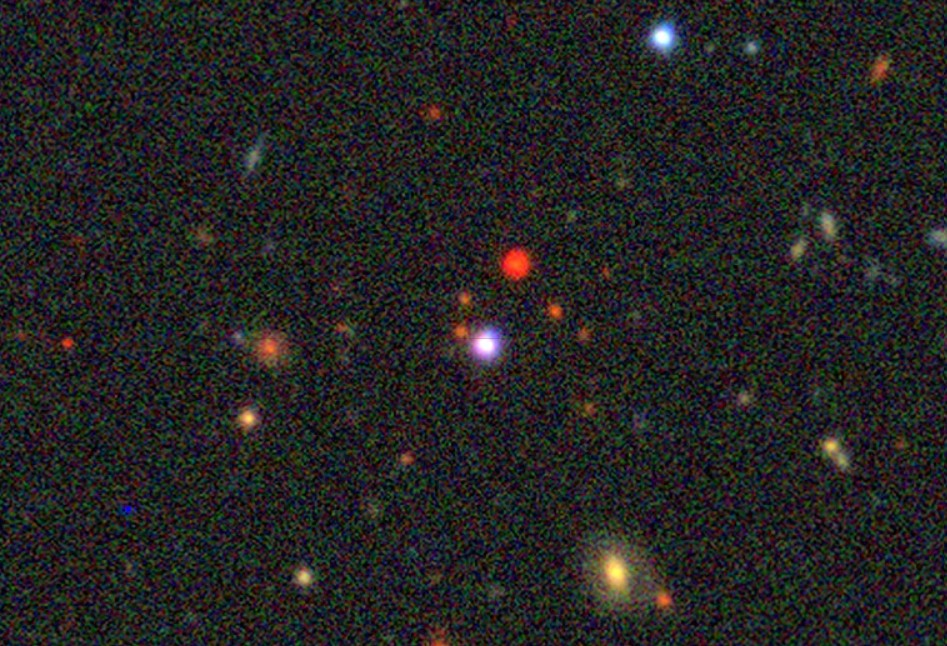
- PKS 2155−152 imaged by DESI Legacy Surveys

Observation data (J2000.0 epoch)
- Constellation: Capricornus
- Right ascension: 21^{h} 58^{m} 06.28^{s}
- Declination: −15° 01′ 09.32″
- Redshift: 0.672000
- Heliocentric radial velocity: 201,461 km/s
- Distance: 6.358 Gly
- Apparent magnitude (V): 18.30
- Apparent magnitude (B): 18.63

Characteristics
- Type: Opt.var.; HPQ BLLAC

Other designations
- 6dF J2158063−150109, 2MASSI J2158062−150109, 2MASS J21580628−1501093, LEDA 2831143, PMN J2158−1501, OX −192, NVSS J215806−150109, VLSS J2158.1−1501, WMAP 018, 1H 2158−150, RX J2158.1−1500

PKS 2155−152 is an optically violent variable BL Lacertae object located in the southern constellation of Capricornus. It has a redshift of (z) 0.672 and it was first discovered as an astronomical radio source in 1970 by astronomers whom they designated it as OX −192.

== Description ==
PKS 2155−152 is radio-loud quasar with a steep radio spectrum with a bolometric luminosity of 45.67 erg s^{−1} and a supermassive black hole mass of 7.59 M_{☉}. It is classified as a blazar due to its variability on the electromagnetic spectrum, showing a 3.5 magnitude outburst detected towards the end of the 19th century in 1899. Between the years 1933, 1941 and in 1948, the object had several outbursts of around 3 magnitudes. When observed in 1995, it showed a variability timescale of approximately 15.5 days.

The radio structure of PKS 2155−152 is compact. An observation with Very Long Baseline Interferometry (VLBI) conducted in May 1993, found the source has a core-jet morphology, consisting of an unresolved radio core whose brightness temperature is estimated to be more than 6.7 × 10^{11} Kelvins. When detected with Very Long Baseline Array (VLA) it has a bright core with a jet pointing towards the southern direction. Further investigations suggested the jet may be extending south-west instead which was confirmed by Pushkarev. An X-ray jet counterpart was found in 2011 by Chandra X-ray Observatory with its X-ray emission terminating at 8 arcseconds from the core.

It is confirmed that PKS 2155−152 is highly polarized. Based on results, it has polarization in both its core and inside a second jet component south-west. VLBI observations showed the core polarization was shown varying while the jet component polarization remained constant. A study involving calculating the vector sum of the two polarized components in the object via model fitting and with VLA, found a sharp drastic decrease in flux density suggesting most of the variations occurred inside the core. In January 2025, Yongyun Chen found the host galaxy of PKS 2155−152 has a logarithm star formation of 3.386 and a stellar mass of 11.97.
