= Time-varying phasor =

Analysing signals

In communication theory, time-varying phasors are used for analyzing narrow-band signals, whose signal bandwidths in the frequency domain are considerably smaller than the carrier frequency. Time-varying phasors are mostly used for analysis of frequency domain of band-pass systems. The method uses classical impulse response.

In electrical power system, phasors are used for transient analysis of the power system keeping the quasi-stationary conditions. They were introduced to facilitate the computation and analysis of power systems in stationary operation. Time-varying phasors are used in dynamic analysis of a large power system. The phasor representation of sinusoidal voltages and currents is generalized to arbitrary waveforms. This mathematical transformation eliminates the 60 Hertz (Hz) carrier which is the only time-varying element in the stationary case. The longer usage of time-varying phasors in large power systems since 1920s have created many misconceptions. One of the misuses suggest that quasi-stationary models are always accurate, but only when the system dynamics are slow as compared to nominal system frequency which is usually 60 Hz.

The concern to study time-varying phasors is raised to understand in-depth the fast amplitude and phase variations of emerging electrical power generator technologies. This is because current and voltage signals of latest machines may have harmonic components and they can damage the entire transmission system which is coupled with the machine. However, if we employ quasi-static model, we can accurately model AC signals by using time-varying phasors as opposed to traditional quasi-static model which supports constant voltage and current signals throughout the network.
