= 4C 12.03 =

Radio galaxy in the constellation of Pisces

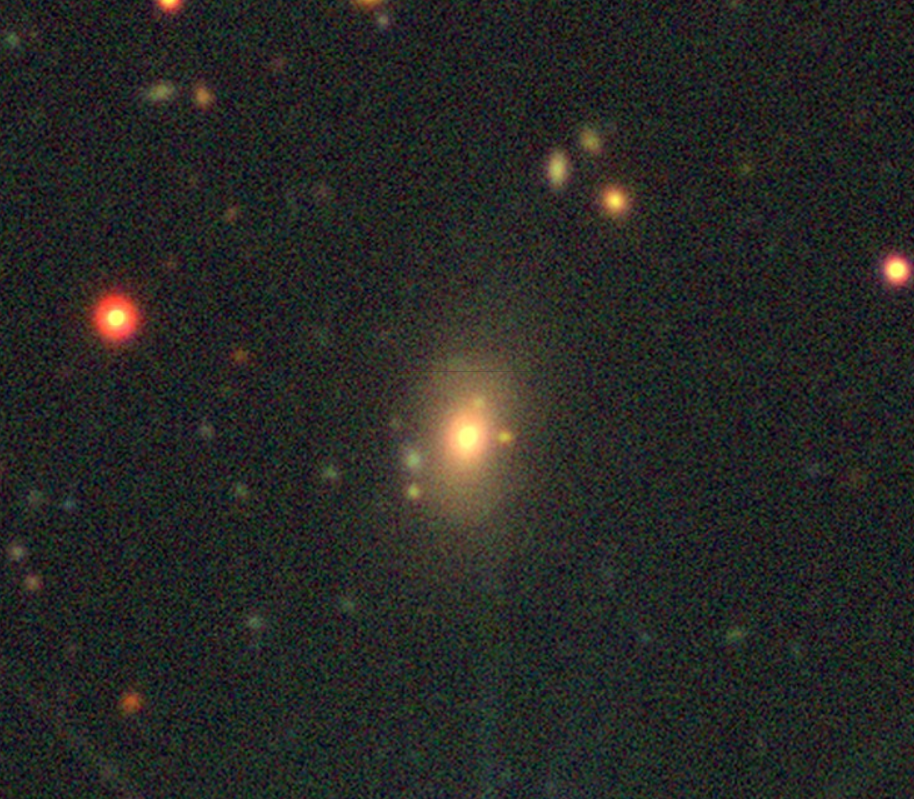
- DESI Legacy Surveys image of 4C 12.03.

Observation data (J2000.0 epoch)
- Constellation: Pisces
- Right ascension: 00^{h} 09^{m} 52.60^{s}
- Declination: +12° 44′ 04.70″
- Redshift: 0.156000
- Heliocentric radial velocity: 46,758 km/s
- Distance: 2.009 Gly
- Apparent magnitude (B): 17.8

Characteristics
- Type: E3 LEG
- Size: ~506,000 ly (155.2 kpc) (estimated)

Other designations
- 2MASX J00095259+1244048, LEDA 1415187, PKS B0007+124, 87GB 000718.0+122806, NVSS J000951+124333, TXS 0007+124, Cul 0007+124

4C 12.03 is a radio galaxy located in the constellation of Pisces. The galaxy was first discovered as an astronomical radio source at the Parkes Observatory by astronomers in 1966, designated as PKS 0007+12. Its redshift of (z) 0.156 was later identified in the summer of 1984 via low-resolution optical spectra observations.

== Description ==
4C 12.03 is found hosted by an elliptical galaxy found to display a low amount of emission lines in its spectrum with a total flux density of 10.9 Jansky and low frequency spectral index of 0.87 in the 178-750 MHz range. It is classified as a low-excitation radio galaxy LEG), a classification of an active galaxy whose central supermassive black hole accretes interstellar medium at a lower rate. The total apparent magnitude of the galaxy is estimated to be 17.8.

Observations with Giant Metrewave Radio Telescope classified 4C 12.03 as having an X-shaped morphology. When observed, it is found to display a symmetrical structure with the source's angular extent being 3.8 x 4.0 arcmin^{2}. There is a jet at the northern side, travelling up to the hotspot that is located in the north direction. Both the northern and southern radio lobes and wings observed at high frequencies, show signs of their spectra steepening; with the spectra indices of the lobes being -0.95 ± 0.12 and -0.86 ± 0.11, while the wings on the other hand, are measured to be -0.70 ± 0.10 and -0.59 ± 0.14. The lobes show evidence of warm hotspots. A radio core can be found clear detected by Very Large Array (VLA), located at the northern jet base.

A more detailed study published in 2021, would find 4C 12.03 has both jets on north and south directions, going towards both hotspots which in turn, forms the basis of the active axis. The wings of low-surface brightness on the other, are formed by the axis on east to west side. Two components are discovered in the source, with the north component reaches the climax of the hotspot while the south component is suggestive of either having a Fanaroff-Riley Class Type I or Type II. Radio emission on extended scales are found detected in the radio lobes on the east-west side. Further observations, found two brightness peaks forming an inner double structure, making this somehow a restarted active galaxy.
