= PKS 1155+251 =

Seyfert 2 galaxy and quasar in the constellation Coma Berenices

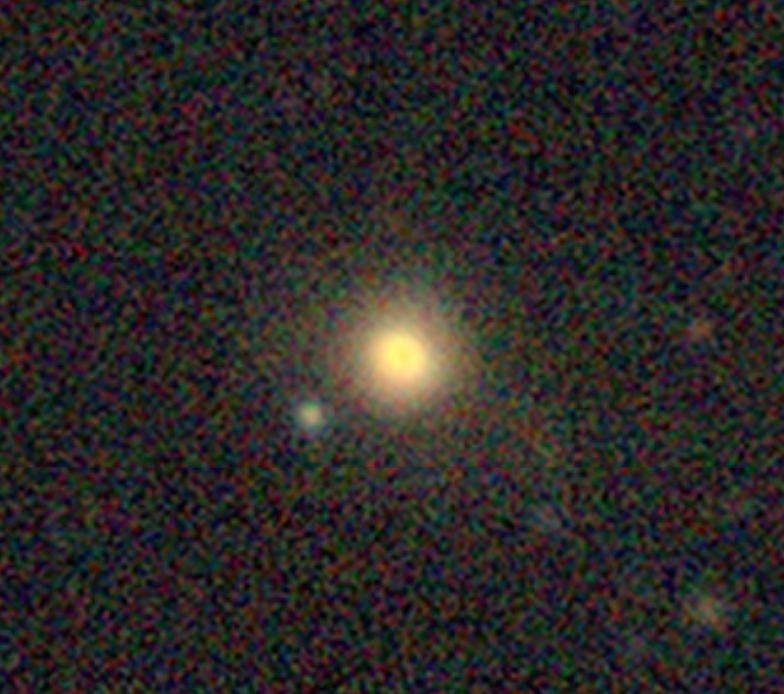
- DESI Legacy Surveys image of PKS 1151+251

Observation data (J2000.0 epoch)
- Constellation: Coma Berenices
- Right ascension: 11^{h} 58^{m} 25.78^{s}
- Declination: +24° 50′ 17.96″
- Redshift: 0.202556
- Heliocentric radial velocity: 60,725 km/s ± 8
- Distance: 2.554 Gly
- Apparent magnitude (V): 19.40

Characteristics
- Type: FSRQ
- Size: ~286,300 ly (87.78 kpc) (estimated)

Other designations
- 7C 1155+2206, VIPS 0500, LEDA 1717805, SDSS J115825.79+245018.0, NVSS J115825+245017, OCARS 1155+251, JVAS J1158+2450

PKS 1155+251 is a Seyfert type 2 galaxy and also a quasar located in the constellation of Coma Berenices. The redshift of the object is (z) 0.202 and it was first discovered as an astronomical radio source by astronomers whom they identified it with a galaxy counterpart in 1974. This object has also been classified as a compact symmetrical object (CSO) in literature.

== Description ==
PKS 1155+251 is described as a radio-loud quasar. The source is mainly compact, with a radio core containing a flat radio spectrum, which is positioned between the lobes of a steep spectrum. Radio imaging made with the Very Long Baseline Array (VLBA) at 15 GHz frequencies found an unresolved component which is surrounded by radio emission towards both directions. An eastern spur feature was discovered from the northern emission component, which goes in the opposite direction from most of the diffused emission. Evidence also suggests the source is shrinking as its hotspot features retreat towards the core position. The angular size is estimated to be 46.0 milliarcseconds in extent with a turnover frequency of 2.0 GHz.

Imaging made with Very Long Baseline Interferometry (VLBI) suggested the radio structure is very complicated with evidence suggesting the northeastern feature is further divided into two narrow jet features. Further observations made with the VLBA at both 24 and 43 GHz frequencies have located the southern complex region. When imaged, it shows the presence of hotspot and blob features that have an orientation from north to west. Further evidence found the component on the central side is unresolved, while the southern component is extremely bright, with an approximate brightness temperature of 10^{9} Kelvin. The measured spectral indexes for both components are around 0.36 ± 0.03 and -0.38 ± 0.03. Two supermassive black holes are suggested to lie inside the center of the galaxy, with the estimated separation of only 3.5 milliarcseconds from each other.
