= Doubly stochastic =

Doubly stochastic may refer to:

- Doubly stochastic model
- Doubly stochastic matrix
