= 1H 0323+342 =

Narrow-line Seyfert galaxy in the constellation Perseus

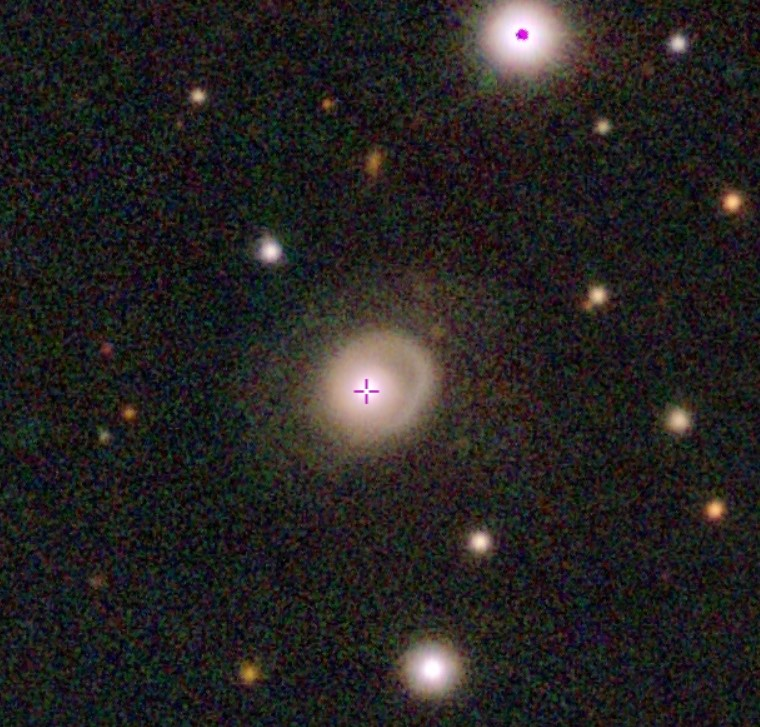
- Pan-STARRS image of 1H 0323+342

Observation data (J2000 epoch)
- Constellation: Perseus
- Right ascension: 03^{h} 24^{m} 41.16^{s}
- Declination: +34° 10′ 45.87″
- Redshift: 0.062900
- Heliocentric radial velocity: 18,857 km/s
- Distance: 831 Mly (254.78 Mpc)
- Apparent magnitude (V): 15.72

Characteristics
- Type: NLSy1
- Size: 59.55 kiloparsecs (194,200 light-years) (diameter; 2MASS K-band total isophote)
- Notable features: Nearest gamma-ray emitting narrow-line Seyfert galaxy

Other designations
- LEDA 2045127, RX J0324.6+3410, WB J0324+3410, 2MASX J03244119+3410459, B2 0321+33B, TXS 0321+340, NVSS J032441+341045

1H 0323+342 known as 2MASX J032441.19+341045.9, is a galaxy located in the constellation of Perseus. It is located 831 million light years from Earth. It is classified a gamma-ray emitting narrow-line Seyfert galaxy, the nearest known example of this subtype.

== Observational history ==
1H 0323+342 was first discovered by Wood as an astrophysical X-ray source during the HEAO-1 X-ray survey in 1984. At the time of the observation the source had an unknown origin. In 1993, the source was confirmed as a Seyfert type 1 galaxy by Remillard and colleagues, who identified several emission-line AGNs from a further HEAO-1 X-ray survey. This galaxy has since been detected by both the Fermi Gamma-ray Space Telescope and INTEGRAL.

== Characteristics ==
The nucleus of 1H 0323+342 is found to be active. The most likely explanation for this energy source in all active galactic nuclei is a presence of an accretion disk around a supermassive black hole. The mass of the black hole in center of 1H 0323+342 is estimated to be 10^{7} M_{☉} based on the width and luminosity of a H_{β} line and empirical scaling relations, or ~ 2 × 10^{7} M_{☉} according to multi-wavelength observations. But later studies shows the mass of the black hole has different estimates. In 2016, a similar mass of (3.4^{+0.9}_{-0.6}) × 10^{7} M_{☉} was found from a reverberation study. However, in 2024, the mass is 10^{7.24±0.01} M_{☉} according to the galaxy's total flux spectrum. Additionally, the nucleus shows a quasi-stationary feature similar to a HST-1 structure inside the jet of Messier 87.

1H 0323+342 shows some characteristics of blazars, including variable fluxes in optical, radio and X-ray bands as well as a compact bright core. Moreover, the core is revealed to have a two-sided structure measuring ~ 15 kiloparsecs. The galaxy also contains a flat-spectrum radio source with a radio loudness of either R_{5 GHz} = 246 or R_{1.4 GHz} = 318. A relativistic jet is present in 1H 0323+342 although its jet power of 1.0 × 10^{45} erg s^{−1} is half the luminosity of its accretion disk.

The host galaxy of 1H 0323+342 is a mystery but it has irregular morphology. There is a peculiar structure in the galaxy. It is either interpreted as a one-armed spiral structure based from an optical image taken by Hubble Space Telescope, or a ring-like structure suggesting a recent galaxy merger.
