= Poisson random measure =

Let $(E, \mathcal A, \mu)$ be some measure space with $\sigma$-finite measure $\mu$. The Poisson random measure with intensity measure $\mu$ is a family of random variables $\{N_A\}_{A\in\mathcal{A}}$ defined on some probability space $(\Omega, \mathcal F, \mathrm{P})$ such that

i) $\forall A\in\mathcal{A},\quad N_A$ is a Poisson random variable with rate $\mu(A)$.

ii) If sets $A_1,A_2,\ldots,A_n\in\mathcal{A}$ don't intersect then the corresponding random variables from i) are mutually independent.

iii) $\forall\omega\in\Omega\;N_{\bullet}(\omega)$ is a measure on $(E, \mathcal {A})$

== Existence ==
If $\mu\equiv 0$ then $N\equiv 0$ satisfies the conditions i)–iii). Otherwise, in the case of finite measure $\mu$, given $Z$, a Poisson random variable with rate $\mu(E)$, and $X_{1}, X_{2},\ldots$, mutually independent random variables with distribution $\frac{\mu}{\mu(E)}$, define $N_{\cdot}(\omega) = \sum\limits_{i=1}^{Z(\omega)} \delta_{X_i(\omega)}(\cdot)$ where $\delta_{c}(A)$ is a degenerate measure located in $c$. Then $N$ will be a Poisson random measure. In the case $\mu$ is not finite the measure $N$ can be obtained from the measures constructed above on parts of $E$ where $\mu$ is finite.

== Applications ==
This kind of random measure is often used when describing jumps of stochastic processes, in particular in Lévy–Itō decomposition of the Lévy processes.

== Generalizations ==
The Poisson random measure generalizes to the Poisson-type random measures, where members of the PT family are invariant under restriction to a subspace.
