= Counting process =

A counting process is a stochastic process $\{N(t), t\geq0\}$ with values that are non-negative, integer, and non-decreasing:

1. $N(t)\geq0.$
2. $N(t)$ is an integer.
3. If $s\leq t$ then $N(s)\leq N(t).$

If $s<t$, then $N(t)-N(s)$ is the number of events occurred during the interval $(s,t].$ Examples of counting processes include Poisson processes and Renewal processes.

Counting processes deal with the number of occurrences of something over time. An example of a counting process is the number of job arrivals to a queue over time.

If a process has the Markov property, it is said to be a Markov counting process.

== See also ==
- Intensity of counting processes
- Poisson point process (example for a counting process)
