= Mixed Poisson process =

In probability theory, a mixed Poisson process is a special point process that is a generalization of a Poisson process. Mixed Poisson processes are simple example for Cox processes.

== Definition ==
Let $\mu$ be a locally finite measure on $S$ and let $X$ be a random variable with $X \geq 0$ almost surely.

Then a random measure $\xi$ on $S$ is called a mixed Poisson process based on $\mu$ and $X$ iff $\xi$ conditionally on $X=x$ is a Poisson process on $S$ with intensity measure $x\mu$.

== Comment ==
Mixed Poisson processes are doubly stochastic in the sense that in a first step, the value of the random variable $X$ is determined. This value then determines the "second order stochasticity" by increasing or decreasing the original intensity measure $\mu$.

== Properties ==
Conditional on $X=x$ mixed Poisson processes have the intensity measure $x \mu$ and the Laplace transform

$$\mathcal L(f)=\exp \left(- \int 1-\exp(-f(y))\; (x \mu)(\mathrm dy)\right)$$.

== Sources ==
- Kallenberg, Olav (2017). Random Measures, Theory and Applications. Switzerland: Springer. doi:10.1007/978-3-319-41598-7. ISBN 978-3-319-41596-3.
