= J082504.56+315957.0 =

Elliptical galaxy in the constellation Cancer

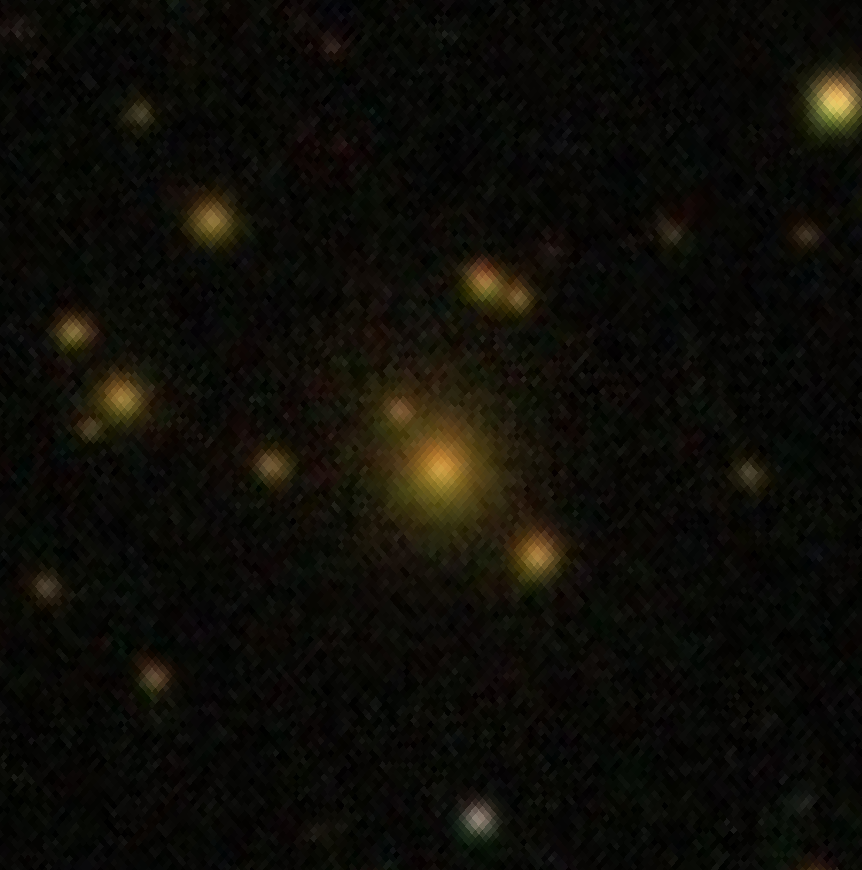
- SDSS image of J082504.56+315957.0

Observation data (J2000.0 epoch)
- Constellation: Cancer
- Right ascension: 08^{h} 25^{m} 04.55^{s}
- Declination: +31° 59′ 57.08″
- Redshift: 0.265000
- Heliocentric radial velocity: 79,445 ± 0 km/s
- Distance: 3,819.8 ± 267.4 Mly (1,171.17 ± 81.98 Mpc)
- magnitude (J): 15.25

Characteristics
- Type: CSS, LINER
- Size: ~526,000 ly (161.3 kpc) (estimated)

Other designations
- 2MASX J08250453+3159569, 7C 082156.79+320942.00, SDSS J082504.56+315957.0, LEDA 1975088, NVSS J082504+315957, OGC 407, TXS 0821+321

J082504.56+315957.0 also known as OGC 407 and 0821+321, is a giant elliptical galaxy located in the constellation of Cancer. The redshift of the galaxy is (z) 0.265 and it is classified as a low-excitation radio galaxy with a young compact steep spectrum (CSS) source.

== Description ==
J082504.56+315957.0 is an elliptical galaxy with an approximate r-band luminosity of 10.1 magnitude based on its r-band estimation made by the Sloan Digital Sky Survey (SDSS). The nucleus is active and has been classified as a low-ionization nuclear emission-line region or a LINER galaxy. The total star formation of the galaxy is 2.98 M_{☉} per year and it has a stellar mass of 11.93 M_{☉}.

The supermassive black hole lying in the center of the galaxy has a mass of 9.66 M_{☉}. The radio source of the galaxy has a low luminosity and is mainly compact. It is also classified as a double-lobed source with the presence of two weak radio lobes that have no prominent hot spot features and a resolved radio core. The total flux density has been calculated as 0.076 Jy at 1.4 GHz frequencies, while the total radio luminosity has been found to be 25.21 W Hz^{−1} at 4.85 GHz. The largest linear size of the source is 7.69 kiloparsecs.

Gamma-ray emissions are present in the galaxy although mainly weak, with a gamma-ray flux of less than 0.18 × 10^{−9} ph cm^{−2} s^{−1} and gamma-ray luminosity of less than 0.50 × 10^{44} erg s^{−1}.
