= PKS J1158+2621 =

LINER galaxy in the constellation Leo

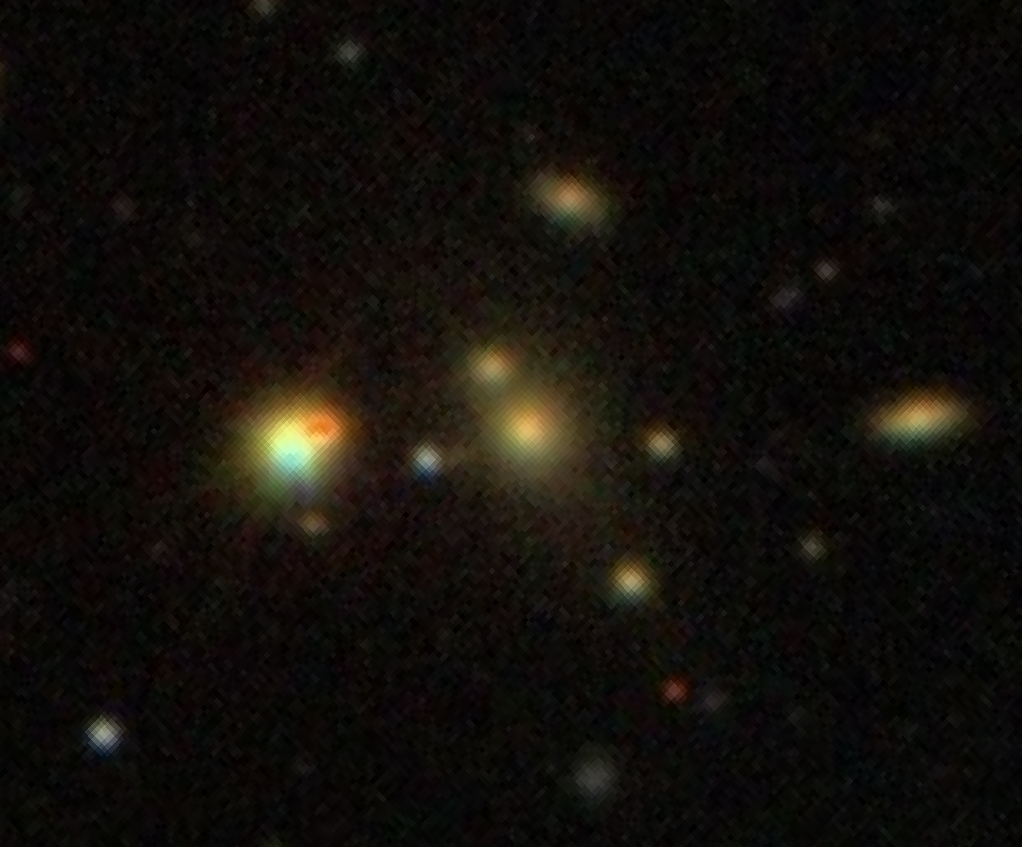
- SDSS image of PKS J1158+2621.

Observation data (J2000.0 epoch)
- Constellation: Leo
- Right ascension: 11^{h} 58^{m} 20.14^{s}
- Declination: +26° 21′ 12.00″
- Redshift: 0.112023
- Heliocentric radial velocity: 33,584 km/s
- Distance: 1.507 Gly
- Apparent magnitude (V): 18.5

Characteristics
- Type: E
- Size: ~271,000 ly (83.08 kpc) (estimated)

Other designations
- 4C 26.35, CLASS J1158+2621, LEDA 97402, 2MASX J11582015+2621120, 4C 26.35A, 7C 1155+2637, ABELL 1425:[OWG93]

PKS J1158+2621 is a low-ionization nuclear emission line region (LINER) galaxy located in the constellation of Leo. The redshift of the galaxy is (z) 0.112 and it was first discovered as an astronomical radio source by E.T. Olsen at Owens Valley Radio Observatory in California in August 1967, where it was given the designation as 4C 26.35 or 4C 26.35A. It is classified as a radio galaxy and is one of the brightest known cluster galaxies in Abell 1425 although being nondominant.

== Description ==
PKS J1158+2621 is classified as a Fanroff-Riley Type 2 radio galaxy. It has two pairs of radio lobes. The first pair are found on the inner side orientated from northwest to southeast directions while the other pair of lobes are on the outer sides in the same direction like the inner lobes. High resolution imaging also found the inner lobes show the presence of structures described as edge-brightened. The outer lobes display surface brightness at their far ends. Traces of radio emission can also be seen at outer ends of each outer lobe. The spectral ages of the outer lobes are estimated to be 135 and 92 million years old. There are also two warm spot features with an estimated age of 10.7 million years.

The radio core of the galaxy is described as weak with an X-ray spectrum. The spectrum is shown to have a flat photon index, with the core itself displaying an absence of a hard power law. There are also detections of molecular gas in the galaxy with the lower limit being 0.37 × 10^{9} M_{☉} and an upper limit of around 2.09 × 10^{9} M_{☉}.

A two sided radio jet is found inside the galaxy with the first half of the jet going in a northwest direction while the other half of the jet is found heading in southeast direction on opposite side. The projected length of the first jet is around 66 kiloparsecs, while the second jet has a length of 56 kiloparsecs. Radio polarization has also been detected inside the northwestern region of the source when observed at 0.6 GHz frequencies.
