= Hawkes process =

Self-exciting counting process

In probability theory and statistics, a Hawkes process is an age-dependent branching process driven by immigration from an inhomogeneous Poisson process. The process, named after Alan G. Hawkes, is also called a self-exciting point process., i.e., the occurrence of an event increases the likelihood of another event occurring. It has arrivals at times $0 < t_1 < t_2 < t_3 < \cdots$ where the infinitesimal probability of an arrival during the time interval $[t,t+dt)$ is

$$\lambda_t \, dt = \left( \mu(t) + \sum_{t_k\,:\, t_k\,<\,t} \phi(t-t_k) \right) \, dt.$$

The function $\mu$ is the intensity of an underlying Poisson process. The first arrival occurs at time $t_1$ and immediately after that, the intensity becomes $\mu(t) + \phi(t-t_1)$, and at the time $t_2$ of the second arrival the intensity jumps to $\mu(t) + \phi(t-t_1) + \phi(t-t_2)$ and so on.

During the time interval $(t_k, t_{k+1})$, the process is the sum of $k+1$ independent processes with intensities $\mu(t), \phi(t-t_1), \ldots, \phi(t-t_k).$ The arrivals in the process whose intensity is $\phi(t-t_k)$ are the "daughters" of the arrival at time $t_k.$ The integral $\int_0^\infty \phi(t)\,dt$ is the average number of daughters of each arrival and is called the branching ratio. Thus viewing some arrivals as descendants of earlier arrivals, we have a Galton–Watson branching process. The number of such descendants is finite with probability 1 if branching ratio is 1 or less. If the branching ratio is more than 1, then each arrival has positive probability of having infinitely many descendants.

== Multivariate extension ==
In its seminal paper, Hawkes also considered mutually exciting processes which are now called multivariate Hawkes processes. The $n$ point processes have arrival times denoted by $0 < t^i_1 < t^i_2 < t^i_3 < \cdots$ for each type $i=1,\dots, n$. The probability of shared points is null, i.e. $\mathbb{P}(\exists (i,k) \neq (j,\ell): t^i_k = t^j_\ell ) =0$, and for each $i$, the infinitesimal probability of an arrival of type $i$ during the time interval $[t,t+dt)$ is

$$\lambda^i_t \, dt = \left( \mu_i(t) + \sum_{j=1}^n \sum_{t^j_k\,:\, t^j_k\,<\,t} \phi_{ij}(t-t^j_k) \right) \, dt.$$

The interaction is now described by a matrix of functions $\mathbf{\Phi} = (\phi_{ij})_{1\leq i,j \leq n}$ and the matrix integral $\int_0^\infty \mathbf{\Phi}(t)\,dt$ plays the role of branching ratio.

== Density-dependent extension ==
Brémaud and Massoulié extended Hawkes processes to allow for a density-dependent birth-rate. They considered an infinitesimal probability of arrival of the following form:

$$\lambda_t \, dt = f\left( \mu(t) + \sum_{t_k\,:\, t_k\,<\,t} \phi(t-t_k) \right) \, dt,$$

for some non-negative function $f$. The original density-independent Hawkes process thus corresponds to $f(x)=x$. Of course, both density-dependent and multivariate extensions are possible at the same time. While this density-dependent extension of the Hawkes process is still a point process, it is no longer a branching process because point offspring distributions are no longer independent.

This density-dependent extension allows for negative propensities $\phi$. Hence it can model self-inhibition or mutual inhibition (in a multivariate context) which can be important in neuroscience.

== Applications ==
Hawkes processes are used for statistical modeling of events in mathematical finance, epidemiology, earthquake seismology, and other fields in which a random event exhibits self-exciting behavior.

== See also ==
- Point process
- Self-oscillation
- Dynamic contagion process
