= J114403.9+440022.0 =

Radio galaxy in the constellation Ursa Major

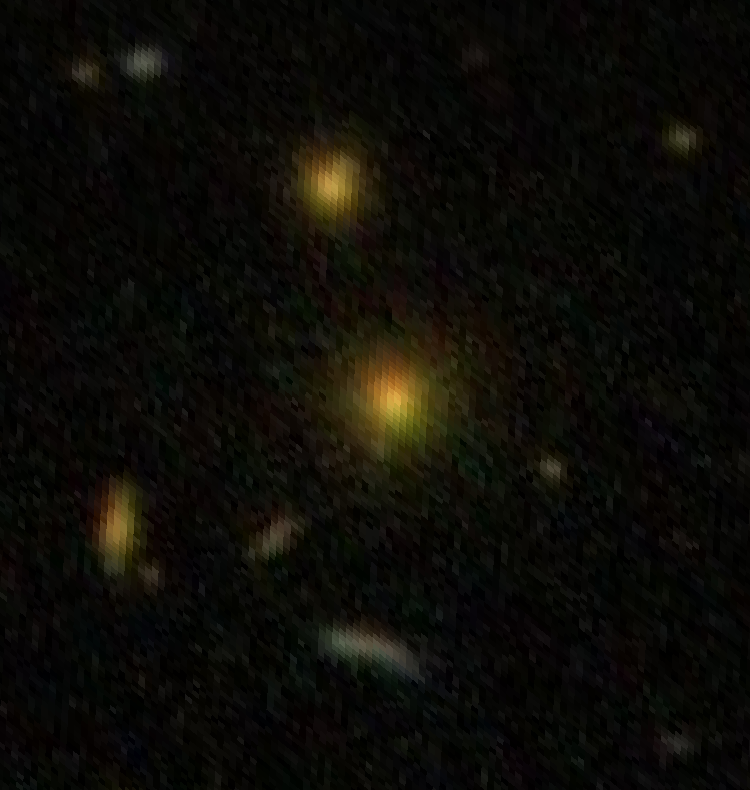
- SDSS image of J114403.9+440022.0

Observation data (J2000.0 epoch)
- Constellation: Ursa Major
- Right ascension: 11^{h} 44^{m} 03.88^{s}
- Declination: +44° 00′ 21.97″
- Redshift: 0.299049
- Heliocentric radial velocity: 89,653 ± 19 km/s
- Distance: 4,323.9 ± 302.7 Mly (1,325.72 ± 92.80 Mpc)
- Group or cluster: WHL J114403.9+440022
- magnitude (K): 13.82

Characteristics
- Type: BrClG
- Size: ~333,000 ly (102.2 kpc) (estimated)

Other designations
- 2MASX J11440384+4400214, NYU-VAGC 1120250, NVSS J114404+440019, OGC 0266, SDSSCGB 11250.01, RGZ J114403.8+440021, WHL J114403.9+440022 BCG, [YHW2016] J176.01616+44.00609, LEDA 3545497

J114403.9+440022.0 also known as OGC 266, J114403+440021 and RGZ J114403.8+440021 is a radio galaxy located in the constellation of Ursa Major. The redshift of the galaxy is (z) 0.299.

== Description ==
J114403.9+440022.0 is an elliptical galaxy residing as the brightest cluster galaxy of the WHL J114403.9+440022 galaxy cluster with 14 confirmed galaxy member candidates. The R-band magnitude of the galaxy is estimated to be 17.22 while the absolute magnitude of the galaxy is -23.70. The galaxy is also designated as 7C B114125.4+441658 in the Seventh Cambridge Survey with its central supermassive black hole mass estimated as 9.09 M_{☉}. There are detections of both hydrogen-alpha and doubly ionized oxygen emission lines with line luminosities estimated as 0.000 and 7.111 L_{☉}. The g–r color value is 1.68 magnitude.

The nucleus is found to be active and it has been categorized as a Fanaroff-Riley Class Type II radio galaxy with a bent-tail FR II-like radio source with the total radio flux density being estimated to be 49.60 mJy at 1.4 GHz frequencies by NRAO VLA Sky Survey (NVSS) and has radio luminosity of 14.1 × 10^{24} W Hz^{−1}. Both of the radio lobes are found to be resolved with a projected length of 125.3 and 145.4 kiloparsecs respectively. The lobes also have an angular separation of 16.7 and 19.4 arcseconds. There is a presence of a radio core but no detections of hotspot features. The total angular size is found to be 55 arcseconds while the linear size is 244.54 kiloparsecs.

A study published in 2025, has found it is a wide-angle-tail radio galaxy. There are presence of radio jets with the opening angle estimated to be 145.6° while the curvature radius is 65.8 arcseconds in total. The jet power has been calculated to be 44.65 erg s^{−1}. An angular size of the source has been measured to be 63 arcseconds whereas the largest linear size is 289.0 kiloparsecs. The spectral index is estimated as 0.78α. Evidence also found the source is indeed bend with its bending angle calculated to be 11.0°.
