= B2 1144+35 =

Radio galaxy in the constellation Ursa Major

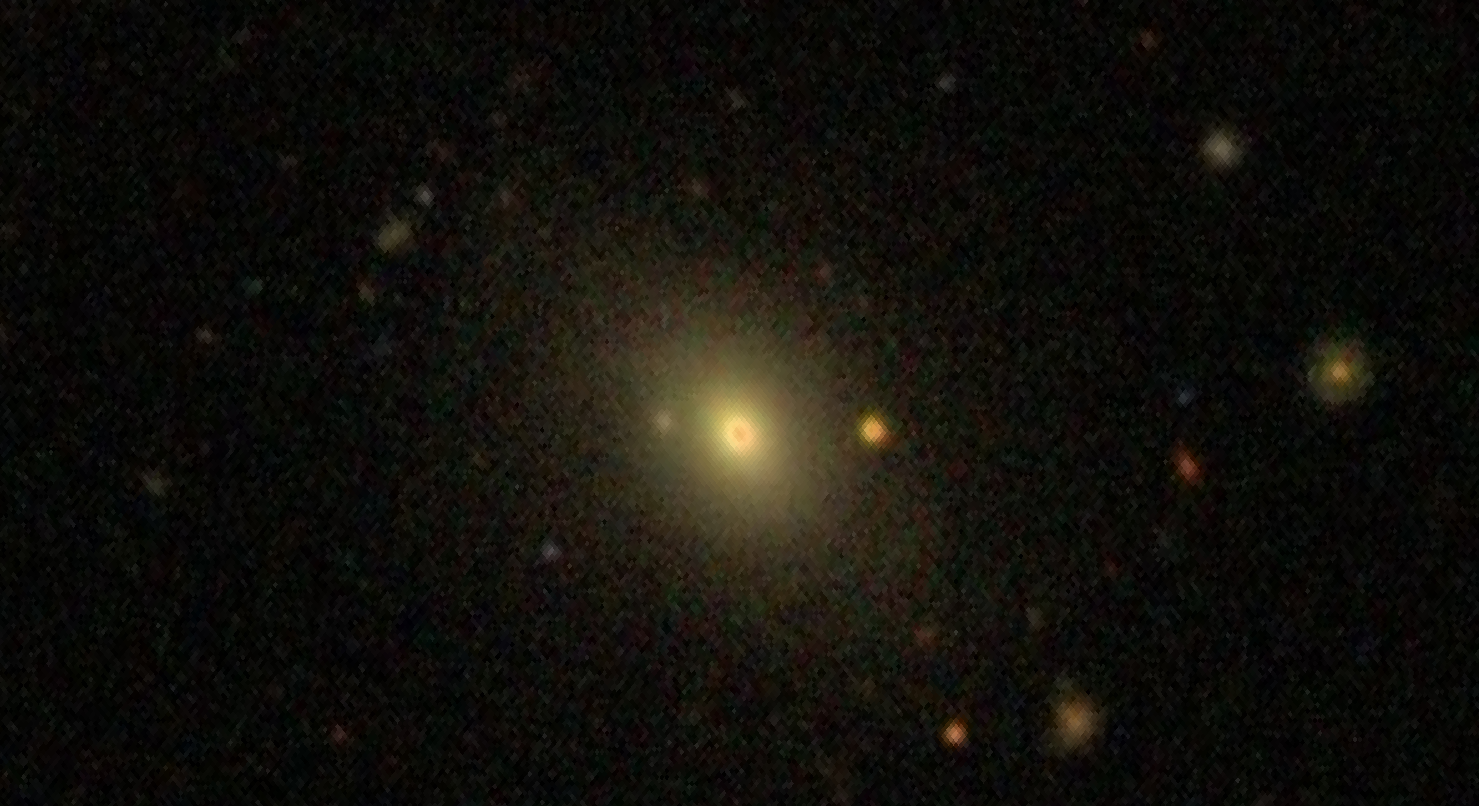
- SDSS image of B2 1144+35.

Observation data (J2000 epoch)
- Constellation: Ursa Major
- Right ascension: 11^{h} 47^{m} 22.13^{s}
- Declination: +35° 01′ 07.52″
- Redshift: 0.062958
- Heliocentric radial velocity: 18,874 km/s
- Distance: 880 Mly
- Apparent magnitude (V): 16.83
- Apparent magnitude (B): 17.89

Characteristics
- Type: BLLAC? Sy2
- Size: ~340,000 ly (104.2 kpc) (estimated)

Other designations
- CGCG 186-048, 2MASX J11472209+3501071, PGC 36775, TXS 1144+352, RFC J1147+3501, VIPS 0477, VERA J1147+3501, 7C 1144+3517, SDSS J114722.14+350107.6

B2 1144+35 commonly known as B2 1144+35B, is a radio galaxy located in the constellation of Ursa Major. The redshift of the object is (z) 0.062 and it was first discovered in 1978 as an astronomical radio source in the Green Bank Second survey by astronomers. This galaxy contains a gigahertz peaked radio spectrum (GPS). It has also been classified as a BL Lacertae object candidate.

== Description ==
B2 1144+35 is categorized as a giant low-power radio galaxy. Its host has a faint magnitude of 15.7 and has a boxy shape appearance, suggesting a galaxy merger event. It is also located inside a medium compact galaxy group and has a companion galaxy located 25 kiloparsecs to the west. The stellar population of the galaxy is mainly made up old supergiant stars between 10^{9}-10^{10} years.

The radio source of B2 1144+35 is large. When imaged in parsec-scales at 8.4 GHz frequencies by Very Long Baseline Interferometry (VLBI), the structure is found to made up of four main substructures including two compact components that have a separation gap of between 2-3 milliarcseconds. The north direction of both components also has radio emission described as faint and extended.

Images made with the Very Large Array (VLA) showed the source is a double with a clearly resolved radio lobe component and a secondary component that is unresolved at. Further imaging has shown the eastern part has a radio lobe of Fanaroff Riley Class Type I morphology and a leading hotspot feature, while the southern part of the western part has a radio lobe, but with an elongated radio tail feature. A short jet is found on both sides of the source. Further observations noted the radio emission on megaparsec scales, and is suggested as a relic source between 50-90 million years old.

A radio core has been detected in B2 1144+35, dominating the northwestern side of the source. When observed on arcsecond scales at both 1.4 and 5 GHz, this core is shown as variable, displaying a flux density increase by a factor of two. There are also smooth flux density variations after 1980, but decreases after the years between 1990 and 1992. Observations made in 2007 found the core has superluminal motion, indicating the emergence of a new component. In 2020, the nucleus of the galaxy was shown to change its position.
