= (a,b,0) class of distributions =

Term in probability theory

In probability theory, a member of the (a, b, 0) class of distributions is any distribution of a discrete random variable N whose values are nonnegative integers whose probability mass function satisfies the recurrence formula (the Panjer recursion)

$$\frac{p_k}{p_{k-1}} = a + \frac{b}{k}, \qquad k = 1, 2, 3, \dots$$

for some real numbers a and b, where $p_k = P(N = k)$.

The (a,b,0) class of distributions is also known as the Panjer, the Poisson-type or the Katz family of distributions, and may be retrieved through the Conway–Maxwell–Poisson distribution.

Only the Poisson, binomial and negative binomial distributions satisfy the full form of this relationship. These are also the three discrete distributions among the six members of the natural exponential family with quadratic variance functions (NEF–QVF).

More general distributions can be defined by fixing some initial values of p_{j} and applying the recursion to define subsequent values. This can be of use in fitting distributions to empirical data. However, some further well-known distributions are available if the recursion above need only hold for a restricted range of values of k: for example the logarithmic distribution and the discrete uniform distribution.

The (a, b, 0) class of distributions has important applications in actuarial science in the context of loss models.

== Properties ==
Sundt proved that only the binomial distribution, the Poisson distribution and the negative binomial distribution belong to this class of distributions, with each distribution being represented by a different sign of a. Furthermore, it was shown by Fackler that there is a universal formula for all three distributions, called the (united) Panjer distribution.

The more usual parameters of these distributions are determined by both a and b. The properties of these distributions in relation to the present class of distributions are summarised in the following table. Note that $W_N(x)\,$ denotes the probability generating function.

Distribution	$P[N=k]\,$	$a\,$	$b \,$	$p_0\,$	$W_N(x)\,$	$\operatorname E[N]\,$	$\operatorname{Var}(N)\,$
Binomial	$\binom{n}{k} p^k (1-p)^{n-k}$	$\frac{-p}{1-p}$	$\frac{p(n+1)}{1-p}$	$(1-p)^n\,$	$(px+(1-p))^{n} \,$	$np\,$	$np(1-p) \,$
Poisson	$e^{-\lambda}\frac{ \lambda^k}{k!}\,$	$0\,$	$\lambda \,$	$e^{- \lambda}\,$	$e^{\lambda(x-1)} \,$	$\lambda\,$	$\lambda \,$
Negative binomial	$\frac{\Gamma(r+k)}{k!\,\Gamma(r)}\,p^r\,(1-p)^k \,$	$1-p\,$	$(1-p)(r-1)\,$	$p^r \,$	$\left( \frac{p}{1 - x(1-p)}\right) ^r \,$	$\frac{r(1-p)}{p} \,$	$\frac{r(1-p)}{p^2} \,$
Panjer distribution	$\left( 1+\frac{\lambda}{\alpha} \right)^{-\alpha} \frac{\lambda^k}{k!} \prod_{i=0}^{k-1}\frac{\alpha+i}{\alpha+\lambda} \,$	$\frac{\lambda}{\alpha+\lambda}\,$	$\frac{(\alpha-1)\lambda}{\alpha+\lambda}\,$	$\left( 1+\frac{\lambda}{\alpha} \right)^{-\alpha} \,$	$\left( 1-\frac{\lambda}{\alpha}(x-1)\right)^{-\alpha} \,$	$\lambda \,$	$\lambda \left( 1 + \frac{\lambda}{\alpha} \right) \,$

Note that the Panjer distribution reduces to the Poisson distribution in the limit case $\alpha \rightarrow \pm\infty$; it coincides with the negative binomial distribution for positive, finite real numbers $\alpha\in \mathbb{R}_{>0}$, and it equals the binomial distribution for negative integers $-\alpha \in \mathbb{N}$.

== Plotting ==
An easy way to quickly determine whether a given sample was taken from a distribution from the (a,b,0) class is by graphing the ratio of two consecutive observed data (multiplied by a constant) against the x-axis.

By multiplying both sides of the recursive formula by $k$, you get

$$k \, \frac{p_k}{p_{k-1}} = ak + b,$$

which shows that the left side is obviously a linear function of $k$. When using a sample of $n$ data, an approximation of the $p_k$'s need to be done. If $n_k$ represents the number of observations having the value $k$, then $\hat{p}_k = \frac{n_k}{n}$ is an unbiased estimator of the true $p_k$.

Therefore, if a linear trend is seen, then it can be assumed that the data is taken from an (a,b,0) distribution. Moreover, the slope of the function would be the parameter $a$, while the ordinate at the origin would be $b$.

== See also ==
- Conway–Maxwell–Poisson distribution
- Panjer recursion
- Poisson-type random measure
