= S-finite measure =

Mathematical function in measure theory

In measure theory, a branch of mathematics that studies generalized notions of volumes, an s-finite measure is a special type of measure. An s-finite measure is more general than a finite measure, but allows one to generalize certain proofs for finite measures.

The s-finite measures should not be confused with the σ-finite (sigma-finite) measures.

== Definition ==
Let $(X, \mathcal A )$ be a measurable space and $\mu$ a measure on this measurable space. The measure $\mu$ is called an s-finite measure, if it can be written as a countable sum of finite measures $\nu_n$ ($n \in \N$),

$\mu= \sum_{n=1}^\infty \nu_n.$

== Example ==
The Lebesgue measure $\lambda$ is an s-finite measure. For this, set

$B_n= (-n,-n+1] \cup [n-1,n)$

and define the measures $\nu_n$ by

$\nu_n(A)= \lambda(A \cap B_n)$

for all measurable sets $A$. These measures are finite, since $\nu_n(A) \leq \nu_n(B_n)=2$ for all measurable sets $A$, and by construction satisfy

$\lambda = \sum_{n=1}^{\infty} \nu_n.$

Therefore the Lebesgue measure is s-finite.

== Properties ==
=== Relation to σ-finite measures ===
Every σ-finite measure is s-finite, but not every s-finite measure is also σ-finite.

To show that every σ-finite measure is s-finite, let $\mu$ be σ-finite. Then there are measurable disjoint sets $B_1, B_2, \dots$ with $\mu(B_n)< \infty$ and

$\bigcup_{n=1}^\infty B_n=X$

Then the measures

$\nu_n(\cdot):= \mu(\cdot \cap B_n)$

are finite and their sum is $\mu$. This approach is just like in the example above.

An example for an s-finite measure that is not σ-finite can be constructed on the set $X=\{a\}$ with the σ-algebra $\mathcal A= \{\{a\}, \emptyset\}$. For all $n \in \N$, let $\nu_n$ be the counting measure on this measurable space and define

$\mu:= \sum_{n=1}^\infty \nu_n.$

The measure $\mu$ is by construction s-finite (since the counting measure is finite on a set with one element). But $\mu$ is not σ-finite, since

$\mu(\{a\})= \sum_{n=1}^\infty \nu_n(\{a\})= \sum_{n=1}^\infty 1= \infty.$

So $\mu$ cannot be σ-finite.

=== Equivalence to probability measures ===
For every s-finite measure $\mu =\sum_{n=1}^\infty \nu_n$, there exists an equivalent probability measure $P$, meaning that $\mu \sim P$. One possible equivalent probability measure is given by

$P= \sum_{n=1}^\infty 2^{-n} \frac{\nu_n}{\nu_n(X)}.$
