= PKS 2004−447 =

Narrow-line Seyfert galaxy in the constellation Sagittarius

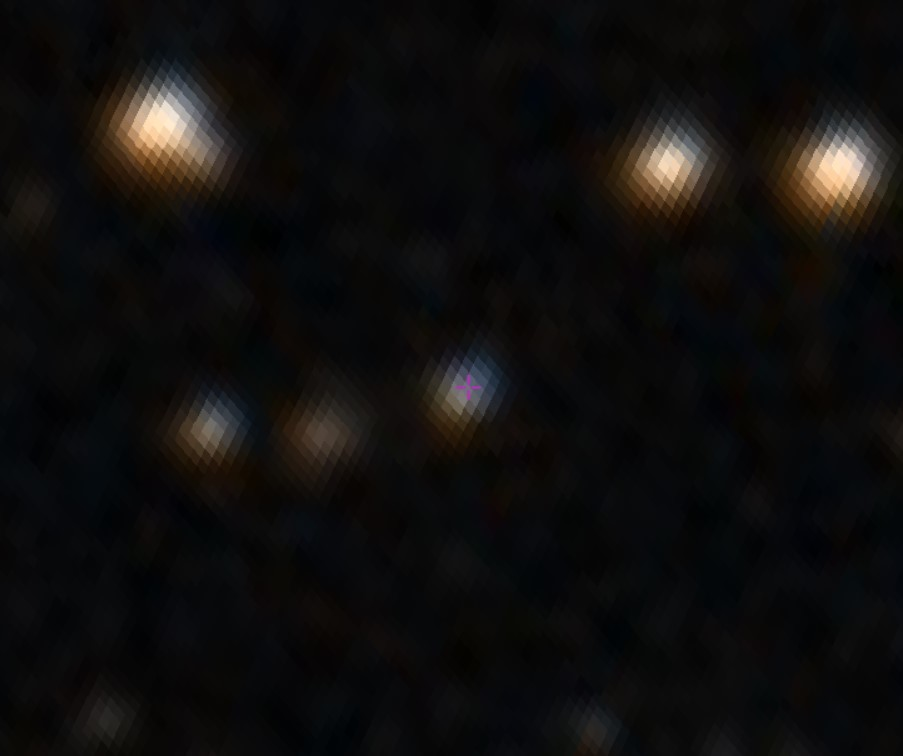
- The narrow-line Seyfert galaxy PKS 2004−447

Observation data (J2000.0 epoch)
- Constellation: Sagittarius
- Right ascension: 20^{h} 07^{m} 55.184^{s}
- Declination: −44° 34′ 44.277″
- Redshift: 0.240000
- Heliocentric radial velocity: 71,950 km/s
- Distance: 2.755 Gly
- Apparent magnitude (V): 19.3
- Apparent magnitude (B): 19.3

Characteristics
- Type: NLSy1

Other designations
- LEDA 2830329, MRC J2004−447, 2FGL J2007.9−4430, OCARS 2004−447

PKS 2004−447 is a narrow-line Seyfert 1 galaxy located in the constellation of Sagittarius. It has a redshift of (z) 0.24 and is the radio-loudest gamma ray emitting AGN known in the southern hemisphere. It was first identified as an astronomical radio source during a very-long-baseline interferometry survey in 1989. The radio spectrum appears to be powerful and compact, making it a compact steep spectrum source. The X-ray emission for this source is described by a simple power-law in the (0.5-10 KeV) energy range.

PKS 2004−447 is classified as a blazar. It is found variable on the electromagnetic spectrum and is a source of gamma ray activity. In October 2019, it was found to exhibit a gamma ray flare, reaching a highest flux of (1.3 ± 0.2) × 10^{−6} photon cm^{−2} s^{−1} at gamma-ray energies (0.1-300 GeV). A further study also showed during the post-flare in PKS 2004−447, there was the presence of Balmer, Paschen and Helium emission lines, with these lines vanishing within a period of 1.5 years.

PKS 2004−447 has a core-jet structure with angular size measuring 40 mas. Its radio emission is found mainly dominated by the radio core, accounting for 42 percent of its total flux density at 1.4 GHz. There is a jet structure emerging from the core with a projected position angle measurement of -90°, which bends to -60° at 20 mas. This jet structure is further divided into two subcomponents enveloped completely from sight by the diffused emission.

The host galaxy of PKS 2004−447 is a late-type barred disk galaxy with a stellar mass of ~ 7 × 10^{11} M_{☉}, estimated from its K-band luminosity. It has a bulge showing a relatively low Sersic index of n ~ 1.2 with a bulge-to-total ratio of (B/T = 0.39 ± 0.02) for its J-band and (B/T = 0.44 ± 0.03) for its Ks-band. These values showed the bulge PKS 2004−447 is of pseudobulge morphology. The host galaxy shows two faint spiral arms and has an estimated black hole mass of 9 × 10^{7} M_{☉}.
