= Magnitude =

Magnitude may refer to:

== Mathematics ==
- Euclidean vector, a quantity defined by both its magnitude and its direction
- Magnitude (mathematics), the relative size of an object
- Norm (mathematics), a term for the size or length of a vector
- Order of magnitude, the class of scale having a fixed value ratio to the preceding class
- Scalar (mathematics), a quantity defined only by its magnitude

== Astronomy ==
- Absolute magnitude, the brightness of a celestial object corrected to a standard luminosity distance
- Apparent magnitude, the calibrated apparent brightness of a celestial object
- Instrumental magnitude, the uncalibrated apparent magnitude of a celestial object
- Limiting magnitude, the faintest apparent magnitude of a celestial body that is detectable or detected by a given instrument.
- Magnitude (astronomy), a measure of brightness and brightness differences used in astronomy
- Magnitude of eclipse or geometric magnitude, the size of the eclipsed part of the Sun during a solar eclipse or the Moon during a lunar eclipse
- Photographic magnitude, the brightness of a celestial object corrected for photographic sensitivity, symbol m_{pg}
- Visual magnitude, the brightness of a celestial object in visible, symbol m_{v}

== Seismology ==
- Seismic magnitude scales, the energy in an earthquake, measures include:
  - Moment magnitude scale, based on seismic moment, supersedes the Richter scale
  - Richter magnitude scale, the energy of an earthquake, superseded by Moment scale
  - Surface-wave magnitude, based on Rayleigh surface wave measurement through heat conduction
- Seismic intensity scales, the local severity of a quake

== Arts and media ==
- Magnitude (Community), a recurring character from the television series Community
- "Magnitude", a song by Moka Only from the 2001 album Lime Green

== Animals ==
- Magnitude (horse), an American thoroughbred racehorse
