= Poisson scatter theorem =

Probability model of random scattering

In probability theory, The Poisson scatter theorem describes a probability model of random scattering. It implies that the number of points in a fixed region will follow a Poisson distribution.

== Statement ==
Let there exist a chance process realized by a set of points (called hits) over a bounded region $K \in \mathbb{R}^2$ such that:

1. There are only a finite number of hits over the entire region K.
2. There are no multiple hits at a single point.
3. There is homogeneity and independence among the hits; i.e. for any non-overlapping subregions $B_1,\ldots, B_k \in K$, $k \ge 2$, the numbers of hits in these regions are independent.

In any region B, let N_{B} be the number of hits in B. Then there exists a positive constant $\lambda$ such that for each subregion $B \in K$, N_{B} has a Poisson distribution with parameter $\lambda |B|$, where $|B|$ is the area of B (remember that this is $\mathbb{R}^2$, in other measure spaces, $|B|$ could mean different things, i.e. length in $\mathbb{R}$). In addition, for any non-overlapping regions $B_1,\ldots,B_k$, the random variables $N_{B_1},\ldots,N_{B_k}$ are independent from one another.

The positive constant $\lambda$ is called the intensity parameter, and is equivalent to the number of hits in a unit area of K.

Proof: $E(N_B)/ |B| = \lambda|B|/|B| = \lambda$

Also,

$$P ( \text{ one hit in B } )  = \lambda |B| e ^ {-\lambda|B|}  \rightarrow \lambda |B|  \text { as } |B| \rightarrow 0$$

While the statement of the theorem here is limited to $\mathbb{R}^2$, the theorem can be generalized to any-dimensional space. Some calculations change depending on the space that the points are scattered in (as is mentioned above), but the general assumptions and outcomes still hold.

== Example ==
Consider raindrops falling on a rooftop. The rooftop is the region $K \in \mathbb{R}^2$, while the raindrops can be considered the hits of our system. It is reasonable to assume that the number of raindrops that fall in any particular region of the rooftop follows a poisson distribution. The Poisson Scatter Theorem states that if one was to subdivide the rooftops into k disjoint sub-regions, then the number of raindrops that hits a particular region $B_i$ with intensity $\lambda_i$ of the rooftop is independent from the number of raindrops that hit any other subregion. Suppose that 2000 raindrops fall in 1000 subregions of the rooftop, randomly. The expected number of raindrops per subregion would be 2. So the distribution of the number of raindrops on the whole rooftop is Poisson with intensity parameter 2. The distribution of the number of raindrops falling on 1/5 of the rooftop is Poisson with intensity parameter 2/5.

Due to the reproductive property of the Poisson distribution, k independent random scatters on the same region can superimpose to produce a random scatter that follows a poisson distribution with parameter $(\lambda_1+\lambda_2+\cdots+\lambda_k)$.

== Notes ==
^ Pitman 2003, p. 230.
