= Intensity measure =

Measure derived from a random measure

In probability theory, an intensity measure is a measure defined as the expected value of a random measure on a set, and hence corresponds to the average volume the random measure assigns to the set. The intensity measure contains important information about the properties of the underlying random measure. For example, a Poisson point process, interpreted as a random measure, is uniquely determined by its intensity measure.

== Definition ==
Let $\zeta$ be a random measure on the measurable space $(S, \mathcal{A})$ and denote the expected value of an element $Y$ with $\operatorname{E}[Y]$. The intensity measure
$$\operatorname{E}\zeta : \mathcal{A} \to [0,\infty]$$
of $\zeta$ is defined as
$$\operatorname{E}\zeta(A)= \operatorname{E}[\zeta(A)]$$
for all $A \in \mathcal{A}$.

Note the difference in notation between the expected value of the element $Y$, denoted by $\operatorname{E}[Y]$, and the intensity measure of the random measure $\zeta$, denoted by $\operatorname{E}\zeta$.

=== Properties ===
The intensity measure $\operatorname{E}\zeta$ is always s-finite and satisfies

$$\operatorname{E}\left[ \int f(x)\zeta(\mathrm dx)\right] = \int f(x) \operatorname{E}\zeta(dx)$$

for every positive measurable function $f$ on $(S, \mathcal A)$.

== See also ==
- Intensity (measure theory)
