= Quasi-stationary distribution =

Type of random process

In probability a quasi-stationary distribution is a random process that admits one or several absorbing states that are reached almost surely, but is initially distributed such that it can evolve for a long time without reaching it. The most common example is the evolution of a population: the only equilibrium is when there is no one left, but if we model the number of people it is likely to remain stable for a long period of time before it eventually collapses.

== Formal definition ==
We consider a Markov process $(Y_t)_{t \geq 0}$ taking values in $\mathcal{X}$. There is a measurable set $\mathcal{X}^{\mathrm{tr}}$of absorbing states and $\mathcal{X}^a = \mathcal{X} \setminus \mathcal{X}^{\operatorname{tr}}$. We denote by $T$ the hitting time of $\mathcal{X}^{\operatorname{tr}}$, also called killing time. We denote by $\{ \operatorname{P}_x \mid x \in \mathcal{X} \}$ the family of distributions where $\operatorname{P}_x$ has original condition $Y_0 = x \in \mathcal{X}$. We assume that $\mathcal{X}^{\operatorname{tr}}$ is almost surely reached, i.e. $\forall x \in \mathcal{X}, \operatorname{P}_x(T < \infty) = 1$.

The general definition is: a probability measure $\nu$ on $\mathcal{X}^a$ is said to be a quasi-stationary distribution (QSD) if for every measurable set $B$ contained in $\mathcal{X}^a$,
$$\forall t \geq 0, \operatorname{P}_\nu(Y_t \in B \mid T > t) = \nu(B)$$
where $\operatorname{P}_\nu = \int_{\mathcal{X}^a} \operatorname{P}_x \, \mathrm{d} \nu(x)$.

In particular $\forall B \in \mathcal{B}(\mathcal{X}^a), \forall t \geq 0, \operatorname{P}_\nu(Y_t \in B, T > t) = \nu(B) \operatorname{P}_\nu(T > t).$

== General results ==
=== Killing time ===
From the assumptions above we know that the killing time is finite with probability 1. A stronger result than we can derive is that the killing time is exponentially distributed: if $\nu$ is a QSD then there exists $\theta(\nu) > 0$ such that $\forall t \in \mathbf{N}, \operatorname{P}_\nu(T > t) = \exp(-\theta(\nu) \times t)$.

Moreover, for any $\vartheta < \theta(\nu)$ we get $\operatorname{E}_\nu(e^{\vartheta t}) < \infty$.

=== Existence of a quasi-stationary distribution ===
Most of the time the question asked is whether a QSD exists or not in a given framework. From the previous results we can derive a condition necessary to this existence.

Let $\theta_x^* := \sup \{ \theta \mid \operatorname{E}_x(e^{\theta T}) < \infty \}$. A necessary condition for the existence of a QSD is $\exists x \in \mathcal{X}^a, \theta_x^* > 0$ and we have the equality $\theta_x^* = \liminf_{t \to \infty} -\frac{1}{t} \log(\operatorname{P}_x(T > t)).$

Moreover, from the previous paragraph, if $\nu$ is a QSD then $\operatorname{E}_\nu \left( e^{\theta(\nu)T} \right) = \infty$. As a consequence, if $\vartheta > 0$ satisfies $\sup_{x \in \mathcal{X}^a} \{ \operatorname{E}_x(e^{\vartheta T}) \} < \infty$ then there can be no QSD $\nu$ such that $\vartheta = \theta(\nu)$ because other wise this would lead to the contradiction $\infty = \operatorname{E}_\nu \left( e^{\theta(\nu)T} \right) \leq \sup_{x \in \mathcal{X}^a} \{ \operatorname{E}_x(e^{\theta(\nu) T}) \} < \infty$.

A sufficient condition for a QSD to exist is given considering the transition semigroup $(P_t, t \geq 0)$ of the process before killing. Then, under the conditions that $\mathcal{X}^a$ is a compact Hausdorff space and that $P_1$ preserves the set of continuous functions, i.e. $P_1(\mathcal{C}(\mathcal{X}^a)) \subseteq \mathcal{C}(\mathcal{X}^a)$, there exists a QSD.

== History ==
The works of Wright on gene frequency in 1931 and of Yaglom on branching processes in 1947 already included the idea of such distributions. The term quasi-stationarity applied to biological systems was then used by Bartlett in 1957, who later coined "quasi-stationary distribution".

Quasi-stationary distributions were also part of the classification of killed processes given by Vere-Jones in 1962 and their definition for finite state Markov chains was done in 1965 by Darroch and Seneta.

== Examples ==
Quasi-stationary distributions can be used to model the following processes:

- Evolution of a population by the number of people: the only equilibrium is when there is no one left.
- Evolution of a contagious disease in a population by the number of people ill: the only equilibrium is when the disease disappears.
- Transmission of a gene: in case of several competing alleles we measure the number of people who have one and the absorbing state is when everybody has the same.
- Voter model: where everyone influences a small set of neighbors and opinions propagate, we study how many people vote for a particular party and an equilibrium is reached only when the party has no voter, or the whole population voting for it.
