= Poisson game =

Game theory model of voting

In game theory and political science, Poisson games are a class of games often used to model the behavior of large populations. One common application is determining the strategic behavior of voters with imperfect information about each other's preferences. Poisson games are most often used to model strategic voting in large electorates with secret and simultaneous voting.

A Poisson game consists of a random population of players of various types, the size of which follow a Poisson distribution. This can occur when voters are not sure what the relative turnout of each party will be, or when they have imperfect polling information. For example, a model of the 1992 United States presidential election might include 4 types of voters: Democrats, Republicans, and two classes of Reform voters (those with second preferences of either Bill Clinton or George H. W. Bush).

== Main assumptions ==
The first assumption of the model is that the total number of players of each type follows a Poisson distribution. In other words, the probability of $n$ voters turning out to support a given candidate is given by:
$P(N=k)=e^{-n}\frac{n^{k}}{k!}$

More important is the assumption that voters are only interested in securing the best possible election outcome for themselves, and are motivated only by the possibility of casting the deciding vote. In other words, voters are assumed not to care about expressing their true opinions; about showing support for a minor party, even if they do not win; or about allowing other voters' voices to be heard. All of these effects tend to produce more honest voting in real elections than would be found in the Poisson model.

In the model, all information is publicly-available, meaning that every voter can estimate the probability that each pair of candidates will be tied. An example of this would be an election with public opinion polling.

== Results ==
The Poisson voting model generates several key results.

=== Approval and score ===
Under the Poisson model, approval voting and score voting behave identically, as each voter's best strategy involves casting a ballot that assigns every candidate either the maximum or minimum score.

=== Plurality ===
Under plurality, sincere voting is never a stable equilibrium with more than two candidates, i.e. many voters are incentivized to lie about their favorite candidate and vote for the lesser of two evils. For example, in the 2016 United States presidential election, some polls suggest that Gary Johnson was the majority-preferred winner. However, Johnson ultimately received only a small fraction of the vote because voters expected him to lose, creating a self-fulfilling prophecy.

== See also ==
- Poisson distribution
- Strategic voting
