= Intensity of counting processes =

The intensity $\lambda$ of a counting process is a measure of the rate of change of its predictable part. If a stochastic process $\{N(t), t\ge 0\}$ is a counting process, then it is a submartingale, and in particular its Doob-Meyer decomposition is

$$N(t) = M(t) + \Lambda(t)$$

where $M(t)$ is a martingale and $\Lambda(t)$ is a predictable increasing process. $\Lambda(t)$ is called the cumulative intensity of $N(t)$ and it is related to $\lambda$ by

$$\Lambda(t) = \int_{0}^{t} \lambda(s)ds$$.

== Definition ==
Given probability space $(\Omega, \mathcal{F}, \mathbb{P})$ and a counting process $\{N(t), t\ge 0\}$ which is adapted to the filtration $\{\mathcal{F}_t, t\ge 0\}$, the intensity of $N$ is the process $\{\lambda(t), t\ge 0\}$ defined by the following limit:

$$\lambda(t) = \lim_{h\downarrow 0} \frac{1}{h} \mathbb{E}[N(t+h) - N(t) | \mathcal{F}_t]$$.

The right-continuity property of counting processes allows us to take this limit from the right.

== Estimation ==
In statistical learning, the variation between $\lambda$ and its estimator $\hat{\lambda}$ can be bounded with the use of oracle inequalities.

If a counting process $N(t)$ is restricted to $t\in [0,1]$ and $n$ i.i.d. copies are observed on that interval, $N_1, N_2, \ldots, N_n$, then the least squares functional for the intensity is

$$R_n(\lambda) = \int_{0}^{1} \lambda(t)^2dt - \frac{2}{n} \sum_{i=1}^n \int_{0}^{1}\lambda(t)dN_i(t)$$

which involves an Ito integral. If the assumption is made that $\lambda(t)$ is piecewise constant on $[0,1]$, i.e. it depends on a vector of constants $\beta = (\beta_1, \beta_2, \ldots, \beta_m) \in \R_+^m$ and can be written

$$\lambda_\beta = \sum_{j=1}^m \beta_j \lambda_{j,m},  \;\;\;\;\;\; \lambda_{j,m} = \sqrt{m} \mathbf{1}_{(\frac{j-1}{m}, \frac{j}{m}]}$$,

where the $\lambda_{j,m}$ have a factor of $\sqrt{m}$ so that they are orthonormal under the standard $L^2$ norm, then by choosing appropriate data-driven weights $\hat{w}_j$ which depend on a parameter $x>0$ and introducing the weighted norm

$$\|\beta\|_{\hat{w}} = \sum_{j=2}^m\hat{w}_j|\beta_j - \beta_{j-1}|$$,

the estimator for $\beta$ can be given:

$$\hat{\beta} = \arg\min_{\beta\in \R_+^m} \left\{R_n(\lambda_\beta) + \|\beta\|_{\hat{w}}\right\}$$.

Then, the estimator $\hat{\lambda}$ is just $\lambda_{\hat{\beta}}$. With these preliminaries, an oracle inequality bounding the $L^2$ norm $\|\hat{\lambda} - \lambda\|$ is as follows: for appropriate choice of $\hat{w}_j(x)$,

$$\|\hat{\lambda} - \lambda\|^2 \le \inf_{\beta \in \R_+^m} \left\{ \|\lambda_\beta - \lambda\|^2 + 2\|\beta\|_{\hat{w}} \right\}$$

with probability greater than or equal to $1-12.85e^{-x}$.
