= Intensity (measure theory) =

In the mathematical discipline of measure theory, the intensity of a measure is the average value the measure assigns to an interval of length one.

== Definition ==
Let $\mu$ be a measure on the real numbers. Then the intensity $\overline \mu$ of $\mu$ is defined as

$$\overline \mu:= \lim_{|t| \to \infty} \frac{\mu((-s,t-s])}{t}$$

if the limit exists and is independent of $s$ for all $s \in \R$.

== Example ==
Look at the Lebesgue measure $\lambda$. Then for a fixed $s$, it is

$$\lambda((-s,t-s])=(t-s)-(-s)=t,$$

so

$$\overline \lambda:= \lim_{|t| \to \infty} \frac{\lambda((-s,t-s])}{t}=  \lim_{|t| \to \infty} \frac t t =1.$$

Therefore the Lebesgue measure has intensity one.

== Properties ==
The set of all measures $M$ for which the intensity is well defined is a measurable subset of the set of all measures on $\R$. The mapping

$$I \colon M \to \mathbb R$$

defined by

$$I(\mu) = \overline \mu$$

is measurable.

== See also ==
- Intensity measure
