= Intensity (heat transfer) =

In the field of heat transfer, intensity of radiation $I$ is a measure of the distribution of radiant heat flux per unit area and solid angle, in a particular direction, defined according to

$$dq = I\, d\omega\, \cos \theta\, dA$$

where

- $dA$ is the infinitesimal source area
- $dq$ is the outgoing heat transfer from the area $dA$
- $d\omega$ is the solid angle subtended by the infinitesimal 'target' (or 'aperture') area $dA_a$
- $\theta$ is the angle between the source area normal vector and the line-of-sight between the source and the target areas.

Typical units of intensity are W·m^{−2}·sr^{−1}.

Intensity can sometimes be called radiance, especially in other fields of study.

The emissive power of a surface can be determined by integrating the intensity of emitted radiation over a hemisphere surrounding the surface:

$$q = \int_{\phi=0}^{2\pi} \int_{\theta=0}^{\pi/2} I \cos \theta \sin \theta d\theta d\phi$$

For diffuse emitters, the emitted radiation intensity is the same in all directions, with the result that

$$E = \pi I$$

The factor $\pi$ (which really should have the units of steradians) is a result of the fact that intensity is defined to exclude the effect of reduced view factor at large values $\theta$; note that the solid angle corresponding to a hemisphere is equal to $2\pi$ steradians.

Spectral intensity $I_\lambda$ is the corresponding spectral measurement of intensity; in other words, the intensity as a function of wavelength.

== See also ==
- Non-ionising radiation
- Emissivity
- Radiant intensity
