= Counting measure =

Mathematical concept

In mathematics, specifically measure theory, the counting measure is an intuitive way to put a measure on any set – the "size" of a subset is taken to be the number of elements in the subset if the subset has finitely many elements, and infinity $\infty$ if the subset is infinite.

The counting measure can be defined on any measurable space (that is, any set $X$ along with a sigma-algebra) but is mostly used on countable sets.

In formal notation, we can turn any set $X$ into a measurable space by taking the power set of $X$ as the sigma-algebra $\Sigma;$ that is, all subsets of $X$ are measurable sets. Then the counting measure $\mu$ on this measurable space $(X,\Sigma)$ is the positive measure $\Sigma \to [0,+\infty]$ defined by
$$\mu(A) = \begin{cases}
\vert A \vert & \text{if } A \text{ is finite}\\
+\infty & \text{if } A \text{ is infinite}
\end{cases}$$
for all $A\in\Sigma,$ where $\vert A\vert$ denotes the cardinality of the set $A.$

The counting measure on $(X,\Sigma)$ is σ-finite if and only if the space $X$ is countable.

== Integration on the set of natural numbers with counting measure ==
Take the measure space $(\mathbb{N}, 2^\mathbb{N}, \mu)$, where $2^\mathbb{N}$ is the set of all subsets of the naturals and $\mu$ the counting measure. Take any measurable $f : \mathbb{N} \to [0,\infty]$. As it is defined on $\mathbb{N}$, $f$ can be represented pointwise as $f(x) = \sum_{n=1}^\infty f(n) 1_{\{n\}}(x) = \lim_{M \to \infty} \underbrace{ \ \sum_{n=1}^M f(n) 1_{\{n\}}(x) \ }_{ \phi_M (x) } = \lim_{M \to \infty} \phi_M (x)$

Each $\phi_M$ is measurable. Moreover $\phi_{M+1}(x) = \phi_M (x) + f(M+1) \cdot 1_{ \{M+1\} }(x) \geq \phi_M (x)$. Still further, as each $\phi_M$ is a simple function $\int_\mathbb{N} \phi_M d\mu = \int_\mathbb{N} \left( \sum_{n=1}^M f(n) 1_{\{n\}} (x) \right) d\mu = \sum_{n=1}^M f(n) \mu (\{n\}) = \sum_{n=1}^M f(n) \cdot 1 = \sum_{n=1}^M f(n)$Hence by the monotone convergence theorem $\int_\mathbb{N} f d\mu = \lim_{M \to \infty} \int_\mathbb{N} \phi_M d\mu = \lim_{M \to \infty} \sum_{n=1}^M f(n) = \sum_{n=1}^\infty f(n)$

== Discussion ==
The counting measure is a special case of a more general construction. With the notation as above, any function $f : X \to [0, \infty)$ defines a measure $\mu$ on $(X, \Sigma)$ via $\mu(A):=\sum_{a \in A} f(a)\quad \text{ for all } A \subseteq X,$ where the possibly uncountable sum of real numbers is defined to be the supremum of the sums over all finite subsets, that is, $\sum_{y\,\in\,Y\!\ \subseteq\,\mathbb R} y\ :=\ \sup_{F \subseteq Y,\, |F| < \infty} \left\{ \sum_{y \in F} y \right\}.$ Taking $f(x) = 1$ for all $x \in X$ gives the counting measure.

== See also ==
- Pip (counting) – Easily countable items
- Random counting measure
- Set function – Function from sets to numbers
