= Brightness temperature =

Measure of electromagnetic energy

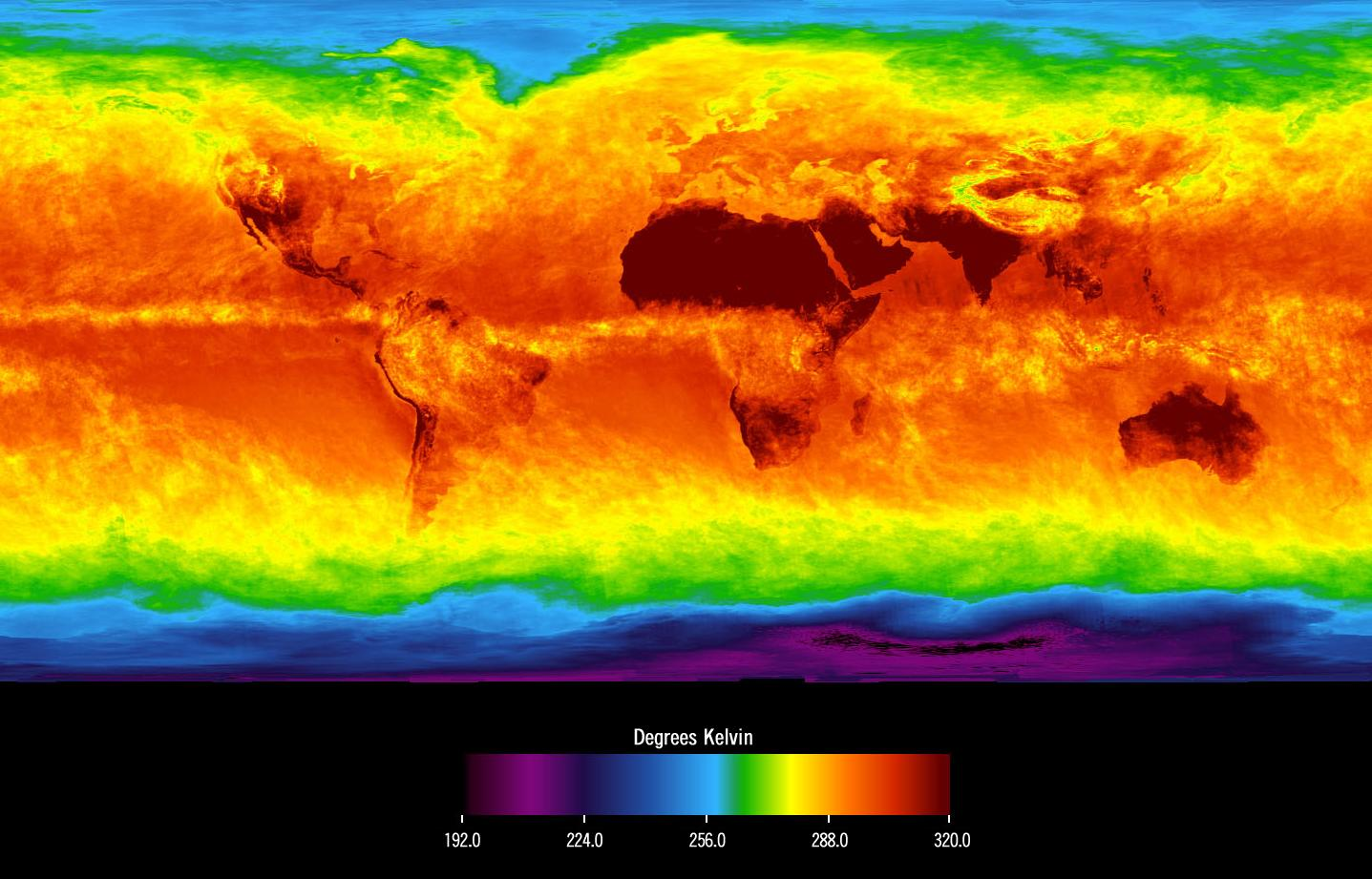
Brightness temperatures of the world in April 2003, captured by NASA's Atmospheric Infrared Sounder

Brightness temperature or radiance temperature is a measure of the intensity of electromagnetic energy coming from a source. In particular, it is the temperature at which a black body would have to be in order to duplicate the observed intensity of a grey body object at a frequency $\nu$. This concept is used in radio astronomy, planetary science, materials science and climatology.

The brightness temperature provides "a more physically recognizable way to describe intensity".

== Comparison with temperature ==
The brightness temperature is not a temperature as ordinarily understood. It characterizes radiation, and depending on the mechanism of radiation can differ considerably from the physical temperature of a radiating body (though it is theoretically possible to construct a device which will heat up by a source of radiation with some brightness temperature to the actual temperature equal to brightness temperature).

When the electromagnetic radiation observed is thermal radiation emitted by an object simply by virtue of its temperature, then the actual temperature of the object will always be equal to or higher than the brightness temperature. Since the emissivity is limited by 1, the brightness temperature is a lower bound of the object’s actual temperature.

For radiation emitted by a non-thermal source such as a pulsar, synchrotron, maser, or a laser, the brightness temperature may be far higher than the actual temperature of the source. In pulsars the brightness temperature can reach 10^{30} K. For the radiation of a helium–neon laser with a power of 1 mW, a frequency spread Δf = 1 GHz, an output aperture of 1 mm^{2}, and a beam dispersion half-angle of 0.56 mrad, the brightness temperature would be 1.5×10^{10} K. In this case, the brightness temperature is simply a measure of the intensity of the radiation as it would be measured at the origin of that radiation.

=== Measurement and correlation ===
In some applications, the brightness temperature of a surface is determined by an optical measurement, for example using a pyrometer, with the intention of determining the real temperature. As detailed below, the real temperature of a surface can in some cases be calculated by dividing the brightness temperature by the emissivity of the surface. Since the emissivity is a value between 0 and 1, the real temperature will be greater than or equal to the brightness temperature. At high frequencies (short wavelengths) and low temperatures, the conversion must proceed through Planck's law.

== Black body brightness temperature ==
For a black body, Planck's law gives:
$$I_\nu = \frac{2 h\nu^3}{c^2} \frac{1}{e^{\frac{h\nu}{kT}}-1}$$
where $I_\nu$ (the Intensity or Brightness) is the amount of energy emitted per unit surface area per unit time per unit solid angle and in the frequency range between $\nu$ and $\nu + d\nu$; $T$ is the temperature of the black body; $h$ is the Planck constant; $\nu$ is frequency; $c$ is the speed of light; and $k$ is the Boltzmann constant.

For a grey body the spectral radiance is a portion of the black body radiance, determined by the emissivity $\epsilon$. That makes the reciprocal of the brightness temperature:
$$T_b^{-1} = \frac{k}{h\nu}\, \text{ln}\left[1 + \frac{e^{\frac{h\nu}{kT}}-1}{\epsilon}\right]$$

At low frequency and high temperatures, when $h\nu \ll kT$, we can use the Rayleigh–Jeans law:
$$I_{\nu} = \frac{2 \nu^2k T}{c^2}$$
so that the brightness temperature can be simply written as:
$$T_b=\epsilon T\,$$

In general, the brightness temperature is a function of $\nu$, and only in the case of blackbody radiation it is the same at all frequencies. The brightness temperature can be used to calculate the spectral index of a body, in the case of non-thermal radiation.

== Calculating by frequency ==
The brightness temperature of a source with known spectral radiance can be expressed as:
$$T_b=\frac{h\nu}{k} \ln^{-1}\left( 1 + \frac{2h\nu^3}{I_{\nu}c^2} \right)$$

When $h\nu \ll kT$ we can use the Rayleigh–Jeans law:
$$T_b=\frac{I_{\nu}c^2}{2k\nu^2}$$

For narrowband radiation with very low relative spectral linewidth $\Delta\nu \ll \nu$ and known radiance $I$ we can calculate the brightness temperature as:
$$T_b=\frac{I c^2}{2k\nu^2\Delta\nu}$$

== Calculating by wavelength ==
Spectral radiance of black-body radiation is expressed by wavelength as:
$$I_{\lambda}=\frac{2 hc^2}{\lambda^5}\frac{1}{ e^{\frac{hc}{kT \lambda}} - 1}$$

So, the brightness temperature can be calculated as:
$$T_b=\frac{hc}{k\lambda} \ln^{-1}\left(1 + \frac{2hc^2}{I_{\lambda}\lambda^5}  \right)$$

For long-wave radiation $hc/\lambda \ll kT$ the brightness temperature is:
$$T_b = \frac{I_{\lambda}\lambda^4}{2kc}$$

For almost monochromatic radiation, the brightness temperature can be expressed by the radiance $I$ and the coherence length $L_c$:
$$T_b = \frac{\pi I \lambda^2 L_c}{4kc \ln{2} }$$

== In oceanography ==
In oceanography, the microwave brightness temperature, as measured by satellites looking at the ocean surface, depends on salinity as well as on the temperature and roughness (e.g. from wind-driven waves) of the water.
