= Σ-finite measure =

Concept in measure theory

In mathematics, given a positive or a signed measure $\mu$ on a measurable space $(X, \mathcal F)$, a $\sigma$-finite subset is a measurable subset which is the union of a countable number of measurable subsets of finite measure. The measure $\mu$ is called a $\sigma$-finite measure if the set $X$ is $\sigma$-finite.

A finite measure, for instance a probability measure, is always $\sigma$-finite.

A different but related notion that should not be confused with $\sigma$-finiteness is s-finiteness.

== Definition ==
Let $(X, \mathcal{A})$ be a measurable space and $\mu$ a measure on it.

The measure $\mu$ is called a σ-finite measure, if it satisfies one of the four following equivalent criteria:

1. the set $X$ can be covered with at most countably many measurable sets with finite measure. This means that there are sets $A_1, A_2, \ldots \in \mathcal A$ with $\mu\left(A_n\right) < \infty$ for all $n \in \N$ that satisfy $\bigcup_{n \in \N} A_n = X$.
2. the set $X$ can be covered with at most countably many measurable disjoint sets with finite measure. This means that there are sets $B_1, B_2, \ldots \in \mathcal A$ with $\mu\left(B_n\right)< \infty$ for all $n \in \N$ and $B_i \cap B_j = \varnothing$ for $i \neq j$ that satisfy $\bigcup_{n \in \N} B_n = X.$
3. the set $X$ can be covered with a monotone sequence of measurable sets with finite measure. This means that there are sets $C_1, C_2, \ldots \in \mathcal{A}$ with $C_1 \subset C_2 \subset \cdots$ and $\mu\left(C_n\right) < \infty$ for all $n \in \N$ that satisfy $\bigcup_{n \in \N} C_n = X$.
4. there exists a strictly positive measurable function $f$ whose integral is finite. This means that $f(x) > 0$ for all $x \in X$ and $\int f(x) \mu(\mathrm{d}x)<\infty.$

If $\mu$ is a $\sigma$-finite measure, the measure space $(X, \mathcal{A}, \mu)$ is called a $\sigma$-finite measure space.

== Examples ==
=== Probability measure ===
If $(X, \mathcal{A}, \mu)$ is a probability space, then the probability measure, $\mu$ is σ-finite, because $X$ is trivially covered by itself: $\mu(X)=1.$

=== Lebesgue measure ===
For example, the Lebesgue measure on the real numbers is not finite, but it is σ-finite. Indeed, consider the intervals [k, k + 1) for all integers k; there are countably many such intervals, each has measure 1, and their union is the entire real line.

For the Lebesgue measure on $\R^n$ a similar disjoint cover can be constructed using unit-volume n-cubes (criterion 2); or by a monotone sequence of expanding n-balls (criterion 3); or by letting $f$ in criterion 4 be the multivariate normal density, for which $\int f\,\text{d}\mu=1.$

=== Counting measure ===
Alternatively, consider the real numbers with the counting measure; the measure of any finite set is the number of elements in the set, and the measure of any infinite set is infinity. This measure is not σ-finite, because every set with finite measure contains only finitely many points, and it would take uncountably many such sets to cover the entire real line. But, the set of natural numbers $\mathbb N$ with the counting measure is σ -finite.

=== Locally compact groups ===
Locally compact groups which are σ-compact are σ-finite under the Haar measure. For example, all connected, locally compact groups G are σ-compact. To see this, let V be a relatively compact, symmetric (that is V = V^{−1}) open neighborhood of the identity. Then

$$H = \bigcup_{n \in \mathbb{N}} V^n$$

is an open subgroup of G. Therefore H is also closed since its complement is a union of open sets and by connectivity of G, must be G itself. Thus all connected Lie groups are σ-finite under Haar measure.

== Nonexamples ==
Any non-trivial measure taking only the two values 0 and $\infty$ is clearly non σ-finite. One example in $\R$ is: for all $A \subset \R$, $\mu(A) = \infty$ if and only if A is not empty; another one is: for all $A \subset \R$, $\mu(A) = \infty$ if and only if A is uncountable, 0 otherwise. Incidentally, both are translation-invariant.

== Properties ==
The class of σ-finite measures has some very convenient properties; σ-finiteness can be compared in this respect to separability of topological spaces. Some theorems in analysis require σ-finiteness as a hypothesis. Usually, both the Radon–Nikodym theorem and Fubini's theorem are stated under an assumption of σ-finiteness on the measures involved. However, as shown by Irving Segal, they require only a weaker condition, namely localisability.

Though measures which are not σ-finite are sometimes regarded as pathological, they do in fact occur quite naturally. For instance, if X is a metric space of Hausdorff dimension r, then all lower-dimensional Hausdorff measures are non-σ-finite if considered as measures on X.

=== Equivalence to a probability measure ===
Any σ-finite measure μ on a space X is equivalent to a probability measure on X: let V_{n}, n ∈ N, be a covering of X by pairwise disjoint measurable sets of finite μ-measure, and let w_{n}, n ∈ N, be a sequence of positive numbers (weights) such that

$$\sum_{n = 1}^\infty w_n = 1.$$

The measure ν defined by

$$\nu(A) = \sum_{n = 1}^\infty w_n \frac{\mu\left(A \cap V_n\right)}{\mu\left(V_n\right)}$$

is then a probability measure on X with precisely the same null sets as μ.

== Related concepts ==
=== Moderate measures ===
A Borel measure (in the sense of a locally finite measure on the Borel $\sigma$-algebra) $\mu$ is called a moderate measure iff there are at most countably many open sets $A_1, A_2, \ldots$ with $\mu\left(A_i\right) < \infty$ for all $i$ and $\bigcup_{i=1}^\infty A_i = X$.

Every moderate measure is a $\sigma$-finite measure, the converse is not true.

=== Decomposable measures ===
A measure is called a decomposable measure there are disjoint measurable sets $\left(A_i\right)_{i \in I}$ with $\mu\left(A_i\right) < \infty$ for all $i \in I$ and $\bigcup_{i \in I} A_i = X$. For decomposable measures, there is no restriction on the number of measurable sets with finite measure.

Every $\sigma$-finite measure is a decomposable measure, the converse is not true.

=== s-finite measures ===
A measure $\mu$ is called a s-finite measure if it is the sum of at most countably many finite measures.

Every σ-finite measure is s-finite, the converse is not true. For a proof and counterexample see relation to σ-finite measures.

== See also ==
- Finite measure
- Sigma additivity
