= Finite measure =

In measure theory, a branch of mathematics, a finite measure or totally finite measure is a special measure that always takes on finite values. Among finite measures are probability measures. The finite measures are often easier to handle than more general measures and show a variety of different properties depending on the sets they are defined on.

== Definition ==
A measure $\mu$ on measurable space $(X, \mathcal A)$ is called a finite measure if it satisfies

$$\mu(X) < \infty.$$

By the monotonicity of measures, this implies

$$\mu(A) < \infty \text{ for all } A \in \mathcal A.$$

If $\mu$ is a finite measure, the measure space $(X, \mathcal A, \mu)$ is called a finite measure space or a totally finite measure space.

== Properties ==
=== General case ===
For any measurable space, the finite measures form a convex cone in the Banach space of signed measures with the total variation norm. Important subsets of the finite measures are the sub-probability measures, which form a convex subset, and the probability measures, which are the intersection of the unit sphere in the normed space of signed measures and the finite measures.

=== Topological spaces ===
If $X$ is a Hausdorff space and $\mathcal A$ contains the Borel $\sigma$-algebra then every finite measure is also a locally finite Borel measure.

=== Metric spaces ===
If $X$ is a metric space and the $\mathcal A$ is again the Borel $\sigma$-algebra, the weak convergence of measures can be defined. The corresponding topology is called weak topology and is the initial topology of all bounded continuous functions on $X$. The weak topology corresponds to the weak* topology in functional analysis. If $X$ is also separable, the weak convergence is metricized by the Lévy–Prokhorov metric.

=== Polish spaces ===
If $X$ is a Polish space and $\mathcal A$ is the Borel $\sigma$-algebra, then every finite measure is a regular measure and therefore a Radon measure. If $X$ is Polish, then the set of all finite measures with the weak topology is Polish too.

== See also ==
- σ-finite measure
