= Mathematical maturity =

Expertise and trained intuition in math

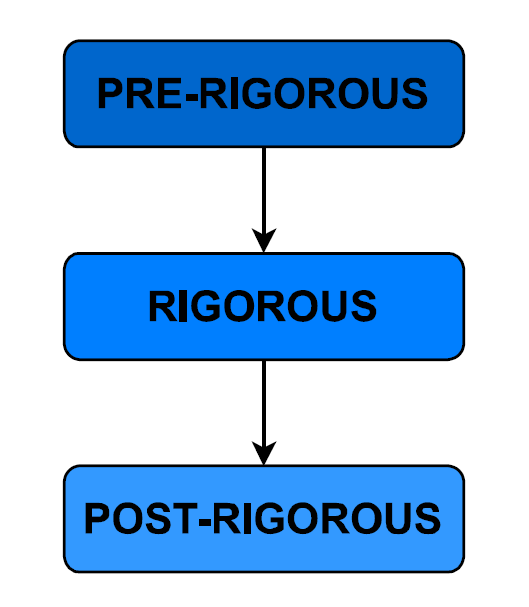
Flowchart depiction of mathematical maturity progression

In mathematics pedagogy, mathematical maturity refers to the mastery of the way mathematicians think, operate and communicate. It pertains to a mixture of mathematical experience and insight that cannot be directly taught. Instead, it develops from repeated exposure to mathematical concepts. It is a gauge of mathematics students' erudition in mathematical structures and methods, and can overlap with other related concepts such as mathematical intuition and mathematical competence. The topic is occasionally also addressed in literature in its own right.

== Definitions ==
Mathematical maturity has been defined in several different ways by various authors, and is often tied to other related concepts such as comfort and competence with mathematics, mathematical intuition and mathematical beliefs.

One definition has been given as follows:

... fearlessness in the face of symbols: the ability to read and understand notation, to introduce clear and useful notation when appropriate (and not otherwise!), and a general facility of expression in the terse—but crisp and exact—language that mathematicians use to communicate ideas.

A broader list of characteristics of mathematical maturity has been given as follows:

- The capacity to generalize from a specific example to a broad concept
- The capacity to handle increasingly abstract ideas
- The ability to communicate mathematically by learning standard notation and acceptable style
- A significant shift from learning by memorization to learning through understanding
- The capacity to separate the key ideas from the less significant
- The ability to link a geometrical representation with an analytic representation
- The ability to translate verbal problems into mathematical problems
- The ability to recognize a valid proof and detect 'sloppy' thinking
- The ability to recognize mathematical patterns
- The ability to move back and forth between the geometrical (graph) and the analytical (equation)
- Improving mathematical intuition by abandoning naive assumptions and developing a more critical attitude

Finally, mathematical maturity has also been defined as an ability to do the following:

- Make and use connections with other problems and other disciplines
- Fill in missing details
- Spot, correct and learn from mistakes
- Winnow the chaff from the wheat, get to the crux, identify intent
- Recognize and appreciate elegance
- Think abstractly
- Read, write and critique formal proofs
- Draw a line between knowns and unknowns
- Recognize patterns, themes, currents and eddies
- Apply knowledge in creative ways
- Approximate appropriately
- Teach oneself
- Generalize
- Remain focused
- Bring instinct and intuition to bear when needed

It is sometimes said that the development of mathematical maturity requires a deep reflection on the subject matter for a prolonged period of time, along with a guiding spirit which encourages exploration.

== Progression ==
Mathematician Terence Tao has proposed a three-stage model of mathematics education that can be interpreted as a general framework of mathematical maturity progression.

In overview, every mathematics student begins with more computational training as opposed to theoretical training, and that balance inverts as one progress through the second stage. At this point, Tao advises:

So once you are fully comfortable with rigorous mathematical thinking, you should revisit your intuitions on the subject and use your new thinking skills to test and refine these intuitions rather than discard them.

Mathematics students that have developed a solid skill set in rigor and theory then transition into the final stage as their perspective shifts to a more encompassing panoramic view of mathematics.

The stages are summarized below:

Stages of Mathematical Understanding
Level	Stage	Typical period	Emphasis	Examples
Beginner	Pre-rigorous	Until underclassman undergraduate years	Moreso on computation than theory	The introduction of calculus in terms of slopes, areas, rates of change etc.
Intermediate	Rigorous	Upperclassman undergraduate years through early graduate years	Primarily on theory; one is expected to be able to comfortably manipulate abstract mathematical objects without focusing too much on insights behind the manipulations and objects	The reintroduction of calculus in the context of rigorous ε, δ notation
Advanced	Post-rigorous	Later graduate years and beyond	Applications, intuition, and a more holistic overview perspective	The improvised and provisional use of infinitesimals or big-O notation; vector calculus computations by analogy with scalar calculus

=== Pre-rigorous stage ===
This stage occurs before a mathematics student has learned mathematical formalism. Mathematics is learned in an informal manner that often incorporates examples, fuzzy notions and hand-waving. This stage is founded mostly in intuition. Natural talent is important at this level.

Formal errors are made as a result of the application of formal rules or heuristics blindly due to the misunderstanding of rigorous mathematical formalism. Such errors can be difficult to correct even when pointed out.

=== Rigorous stage ===
Students learn mathematical formalism in this phase, which typically includes formal logic and some mathematical logic. This serves a foundation for learning mathematical proofs and various proof techniques. The onset of this phase typically occurs during a 'transition to higher mathematics' course, an 'introduction to proofs' course or an introductory course in mathematical analysis or abstract algebra. Students of computer science or applied mathematics usually encounter this formalism during their underclassman undergraduate years via a course in discrete mathematics. The curriculum of philosophy students often includes coursework in philosophical logic, which also encompasses exposure to proofs. Exposure to counterexamples at this stage is standard, and an ability to discern between sound mathematical argumentation and erroneous mathematical argumentation is developed.

This is an important phase for extinguishing misleading intuitions and elevating accurate intuitions, which the mathematical formalism aids with. The formality helps to deal with technical details, while intuition helps to deal with the bigger picture. However, sometimes a student can get stalled at this intermediary stage. This occurs when a student discards too much good intuition, rendering them able to only process mathematics at the formal level, instead of the more intuitive informal level. Getting stalled in this manner can impact the student's ability to read mathematical papers.

Susceptibility to formal errors persists as a result of inapt formalism or an inability to perform sanity checks against intuition or other menial rules of thumb, such as a trivial sign error or the failure to verify an assumption made along the argumentation. However, unlike the previous stage such errors can usually be detected and often repaired once discovered.

=== Post-rigorous stage ===
At this phase, students return to a more intuitive mindset, similar to that of the initial pre-rigorous phase, except now, misleading intuition has been extinguished, enabling students to reliably reason at a more informal level. The assimilation of mathematical formalism equips students with an instinctive feel for mathematical soundness.

This allows them to ascertain an intuitive sketch of a mathematical argument that can subsequently be converted into a formal proof. This optimizes problem-solving efficiency because now formal rigor is infused with a refined intuition. In this ideal state, every heuristic argument naturally suggests its rigorous counterpart, and vice versa. This readies the practitioner to tackle complex mathematical problems that otherwise would be inaccessible.

Susceptibility to formal errors persists, albeit for a different reason; formalism is suspended for the sake of expedient intuitive reasoning and then later recalled for the translation into a rigorous argument, which can be sometimes be imprecise.

Students generally attain this phase towards their later graduate years, after they have begun reading mathematical research papers.

== See also ==
- Scientific literacy
- Religious literacy
- Occupational safety and health literacy
- Mental health literacy
- Abstraction
- Psychological literacy
- Emotional literacy
- Health literacy
- Financial literacy
- Information literacy
- Maturity (psychological)
- Media literacy
- Logical intuition
- Four stages of competence
- Informal logic
