= Campbell's theorem (probability) =

Theorem In probability theory and statistics

In probability theory and statistics, Campbell's theorem or the Campbell–Hardy theorem is either a particular equation or set of results relating to the expectation of a function summed over a point process to an integral involving the mean measure of the point process, which allows for the calculation of expected value and variance of the random sum. One version of the theorem, also known as Campbell's formula, entails an integral equation for the aforementioned sum over a general point process, and not necessarily a Poisson point process. There also exist equations involving moment measures and factorial moment measures that are considered versions of Campbell's formula. All these results are employed in probability and statistics with a particular importance in the theory of point processes and queueing theory as well as the related fields stochastic geometry, continuum percolation theory, and spatial statistics.

Another result by the name of Campbell's theorem is specifically for the Poisson point process and gives a method for calculating moments as well as the Laplace functional of a Poisson point process.

The name of both theorems stems from the work by Norman R. Campbell on thermionic noise, also known as shot noise, in vacuum tubes, which was partly inspired by the work of Ernest Rutherford and Hans Geiger on alpha particle detection, where the Poisson point process arose as a solution to a family of differential equations by Harry Bateman. In Campbell's work, he presents the moments and generating functions of the random sum of a Poisson process on the real line, but remarks that the main mathematical argument was due to G. H. Hardy, which has inspired the result to be sometimes called the Campbell–Hardy theorem.

== Background ==
For a point process $N$ defined on d-dimensional Euclidean space $\textbf{R}^d$, (Note: It can be defined on a more general mathematical space than Euclidean space, but often this space is used for models.) Campbell's theorem offers a way to calculate expectations of a real-valued function $f$ defined also on $\textbf{R}^d$ and summed over $N$, namely:

$$\operatorname E\left[ \sum_{x\in N}f(x)\right],$$

where $E$ denotes the expectation and set notation is used such that $N$ is considered as a random set (see Point process notation). For a point process $N$, Campbell's theorem relates the above expectation with the intensity measure $\Lambda$. In relation to a Borel set B the intensity measure of $N$ is defined as:

$$\Lambda(B)=\operatorname E[N(B)],$$

where the measure notation is used such that $N$ is considered a random counting measure. The quantity $\Lambda(B)$ can be interpreted as the average number of points of the point process $N$ located in the set B.

== First definition: general point process ==
One version of Campbell's theorem for a general (not necessarily simple) point process $N$ with intensity measure:

$$\Lambda (B)=\operatorname E[N(B)],$$

is known as Campbell's formula or Campbell's theorem, which gives a method for calculating expectations of sums of measurable functions $f$ with ranges on the real line. More specifically, for a point process $N$ and a measurable function $f: \textbf{R}^d\rightarrow \textbf{R}$, the sum of $f$ over the point process is given by the equation:

$$E\left[\sum_{x\in N}f(x)\right]=\int_{\textbf{R}^d} f(x)\Lambda (dx),$$

where if one side of the equation is finite, then so is the other side. This equation is essentially an application of Fubini's theorem and it holds for a wide class of point processes, simple or not. Depending on the integral notation, (Note: As discussed in Chapter 1 of Stoyan, Kendall and Mecke, which applies to all other integrals presented here and elsewhere due to varying integral notation.) this integral may also be written as:

$$\operatorname E\left[\sum_{x\in N}f(x)\right]=\int_{\textbf{R}^d} f \, d\Lambda ,$$

If the intensity measure $\Lambda$ of a point process $N$ has a density $\lambda(x)$, then Campbell's formula becomes:

$$\operatorname E\left[\sum_{x\in N}f(x)\right]= \int_{\textbf{R}^d} f(x)\lambda(x) \, dx$$

=== Stationary point process ===
For a stationary point process $N$ with constant density $\lambda>0$, Campbell's theorem or formula reduces to a volume integral:

$$\operatorname E\left[\sum_{x\in N}f(x)\right]=\lambda \int_{\textbf{R}^d} f(x) \, dx$$

This equation naturally holds for the homogeneous Poisson point processes, which is an example of a stationary stochastic process.

== Applications: Random sums ==
Campbell's theorem for general point processes gives a method for calculating the expectation of a function of a point (of a point process) summed over all the points in the point process. These random sums over point processes have applications in many areas where they are used as mathematical models.

=== Shot noise ===
Campbell originally studied a problem of random sums motivated by understanding thermionic noise in valves, which is also known as shot-noise. Consequently, the study of random sums of functions over point processes is known as shot noise in probability and, particularly, point process theory.

=== Interference in wireless networks ===
In wireless network communication, when a transmitter is trying to send a signal to a receiver, all the other transmitters in the network can be considered as interference, which poses a similar problem as noise does in traditional wired telecommunication networks in terms of the ability to send data based on information theory. If the positioning of the interfering transmitters are assumed to form some point process, then shot noise can be used to model the sum of their interfering signals, which has led to stochastic geometry models of wireless networks.

=== Neuroscience ===
The total input in neurons is the sum of many synaptic inputs with similar time courses. When the inputs are modeled as independent Poisson point process, the mean current and its variance are given by Campbell theorem. A common extension is to consider a sum with random amplitudes

$$S =\sum_{x\in {N}} a_n f(x)$$

In this case the cumulants $\kappa_i$ of $S$ equal

$$\kappa_i= \lambda \overline{a^i} \int f(x)^i dx$$

where $\overline{a^i}$ are the raw moments of the distribution of $a$.

== Generalizations ==
For general point processes, other more general versions of Campbell's theorem exist depending on the nature of the random sum and in particular the function being summed over the point process.

=== Functions of multiple points ===
If the function is a function of more than one point of the point process, the moment measures or factorial moment measures of the point process are needed, which can be compared to moments and factorial of random variables. The type of measure needed depends on whether the points of the point process in the random sum are need to be distinct or may repeat.

==== Repeating points ====
Moment measures are used when points are allowed to repeat.

==== Distinct points ====
Factorial moment measures are used when points are not allowed to repeat, hence points are distinct.

=== Functions of points and the point process ===
For general point processes, Campbell's theorem is only for sums of functions of a single point of the point process. To calculate the sum of a function of a single point as well as the entire point process, then generalized Campbell's theorems are required using the Palm distribution of the point process, which is based on the branch of probability known as Palm theory or Palm calculus.

== Second definition: Poisson point process ==
Another version of Campbell's theorem says that for a Poisson point process $N$ with intensity measure $\Lambda$ and a measurable function $f:\textbf{R}^d\rightarrow \textbf{R}$, the random sum

$$S =\sum_{x\in N}f(x)$$

is absolutely convergent with probability one if and only if the integral

$$\int_{\textbf{R}^d} \min(|f(x)|,1)\Lambda (dx) < \infty.$$

Provided that this integral is finite, then the theorem further asserts that for any complex value $\theta$ the equation

$$E(e^{\theta S})=\exp \left(\int_{\textbf{R}^d} [e^{\theta f(x)}-1]\Lambda (dx) \right),$$

holds if the integral on the right-hand side converges, which is the case for purely imaginary $\theta$. Moreover,

$$E(S)=\int_{\textbf{R}^d} f(x)\Lambda (dx),$$

and if this integral converges, then

$$\operatorname{Var}(S)=\int_{\textbf{R}^d} f(x)^2\Lambda (dx),$$

where $\text{Var}(S)$ denotes the variance of the random sum $S$.

From this theorem some expectation results for the Poisson point process follow, including its Laplace functional. (Note: Kingman calls it a "characteristic functional" but Daley and Vere-Jones and others call it a "Laplace functional", reserving the term "characteristic functional" for when $\theta$ is imaginary.)

=== Application: Laplace functional ===
For a Poisson point process $N$ with intensity measure $\Lambda$, the Laplace functional is a consequence of the above version of Campbell's theorem and is given by:

$$\mathcal{L}_N(sf) := E\bigl[ e^{-s \sum_{x \in N} f(x) } \bigr] =\exp \Bigl[-\int_{\textbf{R}^d} (1-e^{-sf(x)})\Lambda(dx) \Bigr],$$

which for the homogeneous case is:

$$\mathcal{L}_N(sf)=\exp\Bigl[-\lambda\int_{\textbf{R}^d}(1-e^{-sf(x)}) \, dx \Bigr].$$
