= AHLA =

Ahla or AHLA may refer to:

- Ahla, Pakistan, a village
- American Health Lawyers Association, a non-profit professional association for attorneys and other professionals in the healthcare field
- Amazones d'Hier, Lesbiennes d'Aujourd'hui (Amazons of Yesterday, Lesbians of Today), a quarterly French language magazine
- Asian Health Literacy Association, an association which aims to provide an overview of the health literacy status in Asia
- American Hotel and Lodging Association, an industry trade group that advocates for hotels and other entities that provide lodging services

== See also ==
- Ahlu, village in Lahore, Pakistan, ancestral place of the Ahluwalia
- Allah, the word for God in Arabic
