= Scientific literacy =

Ability to understand science

Scientific literacy or science literacy encompasses written, numerical, and digital literacy as they pertain to understanding science, its methodology, observations, and theories. Scientific literacy is chiefly concerned with an understanding of the scientific method, units and methods of measurement, empiricism and understanding of statistics in particular correlations and qualitative versus quantitative observations and aggregate statistics. It is also concerned with a basic understanding of core scientific fields, such as physics, chemistry, biology, ecology, geology and computation.

== Definition ==
The Organisation for Economic Co-operation and Development (OECD) Programme for International Student Assessment (PISA) Framework (2015) defines scientific literacy as "the ability to engage with science-related issues, and with the ideas of science, as a reflective citizen." A scientifically literate person, therefore, is willing to engage in reasoned discourse about science and technology which requires the competencies to:

- Explain phenomena scientifically – recognize, offer and evaluate explanations for a range of natural and technological phenomena.
- Evaluate and design scientific inquiry – describe and appraise scientific investigations and propose ways of addressing questions scientifically.
- Interpret data and evidence scientifically – analyze and evaluate data, claims and arguments in a variety of representations and draw appropriate scientific conclusions.

According to the United States National Center for Education Statistics, "scientific literacy is the knowledge and understanding of scientific concepts and processes required for personal decision making, participation in civic and cultural affairs, and economic productivity". A scientifically literate person is defined as one who has the capacity to:

- Understand, experiment, and reason as well as interpret scientific facts and their meaning.
- Ask, find, or determine answers to questions derived from curiosity about everyday experiences.
- Describe, explain, and predict natural phenomena.
- Read articles with understanding of science in the popular press and engage in social conversation about the validity of the conclusions.
- Identify scientific issues underlying national and local decisions and express positions that are scientifically and technologically informed.
- Evaluate the quality of scientific information on the basis of its source and the methods used to generate it.
- Pose and evaluate arguments based on evidence and to apply conclusions from such arguments appropriately.

Scientific literacy may also be defined in language similar to the definitions of ocean literacy, Earth science literacy and climate literacy. Thus a scientifically literate person can:

- Understand the science relevant to environmental and social issues.
- Communicate clearly about the science.
- Make informed decisions about these issues.

Finally, scientific literacy may involve particular attitudes toward learning and using science. Scientifically-literate citizens are capable of researching matters of fact for themselves.

== History ==
Reforms in science education in the United States have often been driven by strategic challenges such as the launch of the Sputnik satellite in 1957 and the Japanese economic boom in the 1980s. The phrase science literacy was popularized by Paul Hurd in 1958, when he charged that the immediate problem in education was "one of closing the gap between the wealth of scientific achievement and the poverty of scientific literacy in America". For Hurd, rapid innovation in science and technology demanded an education "appropriate for meeting the challenges of an emerging scientific revolution." Underlying Hurd's call was the idea "that some mastery of science is essential preparation for modern life."

Initial definitions of science literacy included elaborations of the content that people should understand, often following somewhat traditional lines (biology, chemistry, physics). Earth science was somewhat narrowly defined as expanded geological processes. In the decade after those initial documents, ocean scientists and educators revised the notion of science literacy to include more contemporary, systems-oriented views of the natural world, leading to scientific literacy programs for the ocean, climate, earth science, and so on.

Since the 1950s, scientific literacy has increasingly emphasized scientific knowledge being as socially situated and heavily influenced by personal experience. Science literacy is seen as a human right and a working knowledge of science and its role in society is seen as a requirement for responsible members of society, one that helps average people to make better decisions and enrich their lives. In the United States, this change in emphasis can be noted in the late 1980s and early 1990s, with the publication of Science for All Americans and Benchmarks for Science Literacy.

The National Science Education Standards (1996) defined scientific literacy as "the knowledge and understanding of scientific concepts and processes required for personal decision making, participation in civic and cultural affairs, and economic productivity". In addition, it emphasized that scientific literacy was not simply a matter of remembering specific scientific content. It involved the development of key abilities or skills. "Scientific literacy means that a person can ask, find, or determine answers to questions derived from curiosity about everyday experiences. It means that a person has the ability to describe, explain, and predict natural phenomena."

Some emphasize the importance of an underlying "ethos" that makes it possible to participate in scientific debates and communities. Key norms are that the observations and hypotheses of scientific discovery are part of a communally shared process; that ideas are important, not the status of the person who voices them; that what matters is disinterested evidence, not desired outcomes; and that statements that go beyond observations should be subject to testing.

More recently, calls for "scientific literacy" have identified misinformation and disinformation as dangers. They suggest that civic science literacy, digital media science literacy, and cognitive science literacy are all important components of education, if individuals are to be scientifically informed and engage in individual and collective decision-making in a democratic society.

Comparisons of the views of citizens and scientists by the Pew Research Center suggest that they hold very different positions on a range of science, engineering and technology-related issues. Both citizens and scientists rate K–12 STEM education in the U.S. poorly.

== Science, society, and the environment ==
The interdependence of humans and our natural environment is at the heart of scientific literacy in the Earth systems. As defined by nationwide consensus among scientists and educators, this literacy has two key parts. First, a literate person is defined, in language that echoes the above definition of scientific literacy. Second, a set of concepts are listed, organized into six to nine big ideas or essential principles. This defining process was undertaken first for ocean literacy, then for the Great Lakes, estuaries, the atmosphere, and climate. Earth science literacy is one of the types of literacy defined for Earth systems; the qualities of an Earth science literate person are representative of the qualities for all the Earth system literacy definitions.

According to the Earth Science Literacy Initiative, an Earth-science-literate person:

- understands the fundamental concepts of Earth's many systems
- knows how to find and assess scientifically credible information about Earth
- communicates about Earth science in a meaningful way
- is able to make informed and responsible decisions regarding Earth and its resources

All types of literacy in Earth systems have a definition like the above. Ocean literacy is further defined as "understanding our impact on the ocean and the ocean's impact on us". Similarly, the climate literacy website includes a guiding principle for decision making; "humans can take action to reduce climate change and its impacts". Each type of Earth systems literacy then defines the concepts students should understand upon graduation from high school. Current educational efforts in Earth systems literacy tend to focus more on the scientific concepts than on the decision-making aspect of literacy, but environmental action remains as a stated goal.

The theme of science in a socially-relevant context appears in many discussions of scientific literacy. Ideas that turn up in the life sciences include an allusion to ecological literacy, the "well-being of earth". Robin Wright, a writer for Cell Biology Education, laments "will [undergraduates'] misunderstandings or lack of knowledge about science imperil our democratic way of life and national security?" A discussion of physics literacy includes energy conservation, ozone depletion and global warming. The mission statement of the Chemistry Literacy Project includes environmental and social justice. Technological literacy is defined in a three-dimensional coordinate space; on the knowledge axis, it is noted that technology can be risky, and that it "reflects the values and culture of society". Energy literacy boasts several websites, including one associated with climate literacy.

== Attitudes about science ==
Attitudes about science can have a significant effect on scientific literacy. In education theory, understanding of content lies in the cognitive domain, while attitudes lie in the affective domain. Thus, negative attitudes, such as fear of science, can act as an affective filter and an impediment to comprehension and future learning goals. In the United States, student attitudes toward science are known to decline beginning in fourth grade and continue to decline through middle and high school. This beginning of negative feelings about science stems from a greater emphasis put on grades. Students begin to feel that they are achieving less which causes them to lose motivation in the classroom and student participation drops. It has been well documented that students who retain high motivation for learning will have a more positive attitude toward the subject. Studies of college students' attitudes about learning physics suggest that these attitudes may be divided into categories of real world connections, personal connections, conceptual connections, student effort and problem-solving.

The decision-making aspect of science literacy suggests further attitudes about the state of the world, one's responsibility for its well-being and one's sense of empowerment to make a difference. These attitudes may be important measures of science literacy, as described in the case of ocean literacy.

In the K–12 classroom, learning standards do not commonly address the affective domain due to the difficulty in developing teaching strategies and in assessing student attitude. Many modern teaching strategies have been shown to have positive impacts on student attitudes toward science including the use of student-centered instruction, innovative learning strategies and utilizing a variety of teaching techniques. Project-based learning has also been shown to improve student attitudes about a subject and improve their scientific processing skills.

Teachers can use Likert scales or differential scales to determine and monitor changes in student attitudes towards science and science learning.

== Promoting and measuring ==
Proponents of scientific literacy tend to focus on what is learned by the time a student graduates from high school. Science literacy has always been an important element of the standards movement in education. All science literacy documents have been drafted with the explicit intent of influencing educational standards, as a means to drive curriculum, teaching, assessment, and ultimately, learning nationwide. Moreover, scientific literacy provides an important basis for making informed social decisions. Science is a human process carried out in a social context, which makes it relevant as a part of our science education. In order for people to make evidence-informed decision, everyone should seek to improve their scientific literacy.

Relevant research has suggested ways to promote scientific literacy to students more efficiently. Programs to promote scientific literacy among students abound, including several programs sponsored by technology companies, as well as quiz bowls and science fairs. A partial list of such programs includes the Global Challenge Award, the National Ocean Sciences Bowl and Action Bioscience.

Some organizations have attempted to compare the scientific literacy of adults in different countries. The OECD found that scientific literacy in the United States is not measurably different from the OECD average. Science News reports "The new U.S. rate, based on questionnaires administered in 2008, is seven percentage points behind Sweden, the only European nation to exceed the Americans. The U.S. figure is slightly higher than that for Denmark, Finland, Norway and the Netherlands. And it's double the 2005 rate in the United Kingdom (and the collective rate for the European Union)."

University educators are attempting to develop reliable instruments to measure scientific literacy, and the use of concept inventories is increasing in the fields of physics, astronomy, chemistry, biology and earth science.

== See also ==
- Mathematical maturity
- Occupational safety and health literacy
- Mental health literacy
- Psychological literacy
- Emotional literacy
- Health literacy
- Financial literacy
- Information literacy
- Maturity (psychological)
- Trends in International Mathematics and Science Study
- Public awareness of science
- Science, technology, society and environment education
- Science outreach
- Sense about Science, encouraging evidence-based approach to scientific and technological developments
- STEM fields
