= Juniper Advisory =

American healthcare-industry consulting firm

- Company type: Private company
- Industry: Investment banking
- Founded: Chicago, Illinois, U.S. (2006)
- Key people: James Burgdorfer (Founder); David Gordon (Founder); Rex James Burgdorfer; Jordan Shields
- Website: www.JuniperAdvisory.com

Juniper Advisory is an investment banking firm based in Chicago that focuses exclusively on non-profit hospital mergers and acquisitions. Founded by veteran investment bankers James Burgdorfer and David Gordon, the firm provides strategic financial advice relating to business combination transactions and other corporate finance matters.

The firm specializes in mergers, acquisitions, divestitures, partnerships, joint ventures, and lease arrangements in the industry. It is particularly active in advising government-owned, 501(c)(3), faith-based, and academic medical centers on structural ownership alternatives.

== Background ==
Members of Juniper came from several larger Wall Street firms, includes: Citigroup, J.P. Morgan, Piper Jaffray, Morgan Stanley, A.G. Becker, Nuveen, Rothschild & Co, William Blair, and others. Several modeled their academic educations around healthcare finance and economics at the University of Chicago, Northwestern University, University of Michigan, University of Notre Dame, and Vanderbilt University.

== Transactions ==
Recent advisory assignments include transactions with: The Cleveland Clinic, Northwestern Memorial Hospital, The University of Chicago Medical Center, Christus Health, Adventist Health, Jefferson Health, Hospital Corporation of America (during ownership under Bain Capital, KKR, and Merrill Lynch), Duke University Health System and LifePoint Health, UnityPoint Health, Spectrum Health, Sentara Healthcare, Dignity Health, McLaren Health Care Corporation, Ardent Health Services (a portfolio company of Welsh, Carson, Anderson & Stowe, Equity International, and Ventas, Inc., Vanguard Health Systems, a portfolio company of The Blackstone Group now part of Tenet Healthcare, Community Health Systems, RCCH Health (a portfolio company of Warburg Pincus, Apollo Global Management) and Temple University Hospital.

== Industry involvement ==
The principals are active writers and speakers in the non-profit healthcare industry, and are frequently cited by The Wall Street Journal, The Bond Buyer, Modern Healthcare, Trustee, American Health Lawyers Association, Chicago Tribune, WGN-TV, and Healthcare Financial Management Association.

Recent topics include fair market value considerations in consolidation (business) transactions, fiduciary governance responsibilities in change of control transactions. The team has authored a number of research articles, including stand-alone whitepapers for the Chicago Council on Global Affairs.

== Key team members ==
- James Burgdorfer: Principal
- David Gordan: Principal
- Rex Burgdorfer : Partner
- Jordan Shields: Partner
