= Rebecca Heflin =

American novelist

B. Dianne Farb
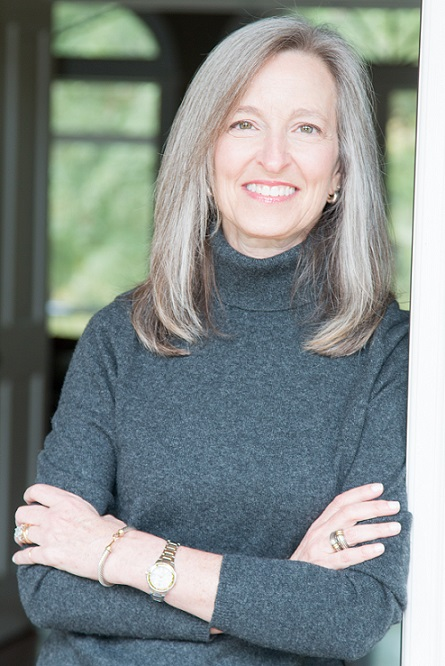
- Born: 1963 (age 62–63)
- Education: University of Florida (JD); University of North Florida (BA)
- Spouse: Ron Farb
- Writing career
- Pen name: Rebecca Heflin
- Genres: Contemporary romance Women's fiction
- Notable awards: 2013 Colorado Romance Writers Award of Excellence; 2013 Florida Writers Association Royal Palm Literary Award; 2014 FWA Royal Palm Literary Award
- Website: www.rebeccaheflin.com

Rebecca Heflin (a.k.a. Barbara Dianne Farb born in 1963) is an American women's fiction and contemporary romance novelist living in Gainesville, Florida. The name Rebecca Heflin is a pseudonym used by B. Dianne Farb and was inspired by her great-great-grandmother, Sarah Anne Rebecca Heflin Apple Smith. As Dianne Farb, she works at the University of Florida and runs a local nonprofit organization with her husband.

== Life as Dianne Farb ==
Dianne Farb grew up in Jacksonville, Florida, where she lived most of her adult life. She met Ron Farb in 1993 and married him soon after. Together, they moved to Gainesville in 2001 and have resided in Haile Plantation since 2004.

=== Education and law career ===
After graduating from high school, Farb worked in the Medicare division for Blue Cross Blue Shield. Her interest in health care then led her to work for two private medical practices. At the age of 30, Farb began her college education at the University of North Florida, where she received her B.A. in literature in 1997. While attending UNF, she was honored with the Award for Excellence in Literary Scholarship. She graduated from the University of Florida Levin College of Law in 2000 with her J.D. and a specialization in health care. She was hired by the University of Florida in 2001 as an attorney for general higher education law and eventually became Associate University Counsel for Research and Health Affairs.

Farb is a member of various legal and health-related organizations, including the National Association of College and University Attorneys, the American Health Lawyers Association, the Florida Bioethics Network, and the Applied Research Ethics National Association, among others.

=== Nonprofit organization ===
In 2002, Dianne and Ron Farb co-founded the Climb for Cancer Foundation of Gainesville, a not-for-profit organization that raises funds for cancer programs by climbing mountains (similarly to organizations that raise donations through walks or runs). To date, the organization has raised more than $1 million for cancer research and to support patients and families affected by the disease.

More than a decade after the organization was established, Dianne Farb was recognized by Santa Fe College as one of two 2013 Women of Distinction for her work with Climb for Cancer, in addition to other philanthropic efforts.

== Writing career ==
The beginning of her writing career was marked by a "mid-life crisis" that resulted in her seeking a creative outlet. She traveled to England for a week-long adult learning course at Christ Church of Oxford University. This trip inspired the setting for her debut novel, The Promise of Change, which was picked up by Soul Mate Publishing in September 2011 and published within the year. Heflin has enjoyed participating in multiple adult learning courses at Christ Church, including programs on topics like Jane Austen, Queen Elizabeth I, and the history of the English language.

Her second novel, Rescuing Lacey, was set in Costa Rica, where Heflin had previously traveled to. Some anecdotes in the narrative were based loosely on her own personal experiences there. Rescuing Lacey received generally favorable reviews and won several awards the year following its 2012 release.

After Rescuing Lacey, Heflin began working on the three-part Dreams Come True series, which yielded Dreams of Perfection, Ship of Dreams, and Dreams of Her Own. These novels were released each consecutive year from 2014 to 2016. The author described Dreams of Perfection as "a lighthearted, comedic romance with a Pygmalion-type twist to it."

Heflin's works are represented by Rebecca Heflin Books, LLC. The company's tagline is "Real, Sexy, Romance." Her first five novels were published through Soul Mate Publishing, a small independently owned publishing company specializing in romantic fiction in both electronic and print formats.

The author's Sterling University novella series marks her first venture into self-publishing. All of Heflin's books are categorized within the contemporary romance or women's fiction genres.

Heflin is a member of Romance Writers of America, RWA Contemporary Romance, Florida Romance Writers, and Florida Writers Association. One of her greatest writing inspirations is famed romance novelist Nora Roberts.

== Recognition and awards ==
Rebecca Heflin's novels have been reviewed by The Romance Reviews, Romance Junkies, InD'tale Magazine, and several other romance publications. She has also been featured by a number of Gainesville-based news outlets, such as The Alligator and The Gainesville Sun.

In 2011, The Promise of Change was recognized as a finalist for the Florida Writers Association Royal Palm Literary Award. Her debut novel was also a finalist in 2013 for the Wisconsin Romance Writers Write Touch Readers' Award.

Heflin's second novel was highly praised and received several awards and merits in 2013.

- Georgia Romance Writers Published Maggie Finalist
- Shooting Star Award
- Gayle Wilson Award of Excellence Finalist
- Colorado Romance Writers Award of Excellence Winner
- Virginia Romance Writers Holt Medallion Award of Merit
- Florida Writers Association Royal Palm Literary Award Winner

That same year, her third novel, Dreams of Perfection won second place in the Tampa Area Romance Writers TARA Contest. In 2014, Dreams of Perfection won Heflin her second FWA Royal Palm Literary Award.

Two years later, Dreams of Her Own, the concluding novel of the Dreams Come True series, placed third place for that same award.

== Bibliography ==
Standalone novels

- The Promise of Change (2011)
- Rescuing Lacey (2012)

Dreams Come True series

- Dreams of Perfection (2014)
- Ship of Dreams (2015)
- Dreams of Her Own (2016)

Sterling University novella series

- Romancing Dr. Love (2017)
- Winning Dr. Wentworth (2017)
- Educating Dr. Mayfield (2017)

Seasons of Northridge series

- A Season to Dance (2018)
- A Season to Love (2020)
- A Season to Remember (2021)
- A Season to Give: A Christmas Novella (2022)
