= Simplee =

American developer of health care industry software

- Industry: Technology
- Founded: 2010
- Founder: Tomer Shoval, Roberto Rabinovich, Tom Tsarfati
- Headquarters: Palo Alto, California, U.S.A.
- Key people: Tomer Shoval, CEO; Robert Rabinovich, COO; Tom Tsarfati, CTO, Derick Sutton, CFO
- Website: simplee.com

Simplee is an American software-as-a-service company that develops payment software for the health care industry. The company and its products have been featured in several publications including Forbes, HFMA, Modern Healthcare, PaymentsSource, and TechCrunch.

== History ==
=== Early years and initial funding ===
Simplee was founded by Tomer Shoval who currently serves as the company CEO. In 2009 he went on vacation to Mexico and his entire family got sick. Upon returning to the United States, he received invoices, bills, and insurance statements associated with the trip. Shoval became frustrated with trying to decipher the documents and decided to create a software to manage and track health expenses for both patients and health care providers. He was working at eBay at the time and stepped down to form the company with Roberto Rabinovich and Tom Tsarfati, launching the company in 2010.

Simplee received $1.8 million in angel funding led by Greylock IL and launched its first product in 2011, a free consumer app initially known as Simplee for tracking medical expenses similar to the financial management tools of Mint.com. The product was branded as SimpleeONE, and linked health insurance accounts for easier management of medical bills and payments across providers.

=== Enterprise launch and additional funding ===
In 2012, Simplee launched its enterprise software platform SimpleePAY for health care providers after receiving $6 million Series A investment led by Social+Capital Partnership. SimplePAY was specific for health care providers, allowing patients to view and pay their medical bills online. Simplee raised an additional $10 million in Series B funding led by Nashville-based healthcare investor The Heritage Group in 2013. The same year it partnered with its charter customer, El Camino Hospital.

The company grew its customers in 2014 by adding healthcare providers such as CardinalHealth, Gundersen Health System, LifePoint Health, and Memorial Hermann Healthcare System, the largest health system in Texas. Simplee also partnered with ExactTarget, Vantiv, and Wells Fargo the same year.

== Products and services ==
SimplePAY is specific for health care providers, allowing patients to view and pay their medical bills online. In March 2015, it was reported that Simplee was collecting over $1 Million per day through SimpleePAY, with an expectation to collect more than $1 billion by the end of 2015. Modern Healthcare featured Simplee’s partnership with Memorial Hermann in May 2015, in which Memorial Hermann’s PayMyBill technology, powered by SimpleePAY, has seen self-service payments increase by 53% and reduced collection costs by 23%.

In June 2015, Simplee expanded SimpleePay into the Simplee Financial Engagement Platform suite with the launch of two additional products: SimpleeESTIMATE, a cost estimation tool, and SimpleeCREDIT, a consumer-focused financing options system.

== Awards and recognition ==
Simplee has been a Webby Award honoree in 2012, 2013, and 2015. It was a winner of a Fierce Innovation Award in 2014 in the revenue cycle category. The same year, the American Hospital Association announced an exclusive endorsement for SimpleePAY.

== See also ==
- Patient experience
- Digital health
- Health information technology
- Healthcare Financial Management Association
- Software as a service
