= Health literacy =

Ability to understand healthcare information

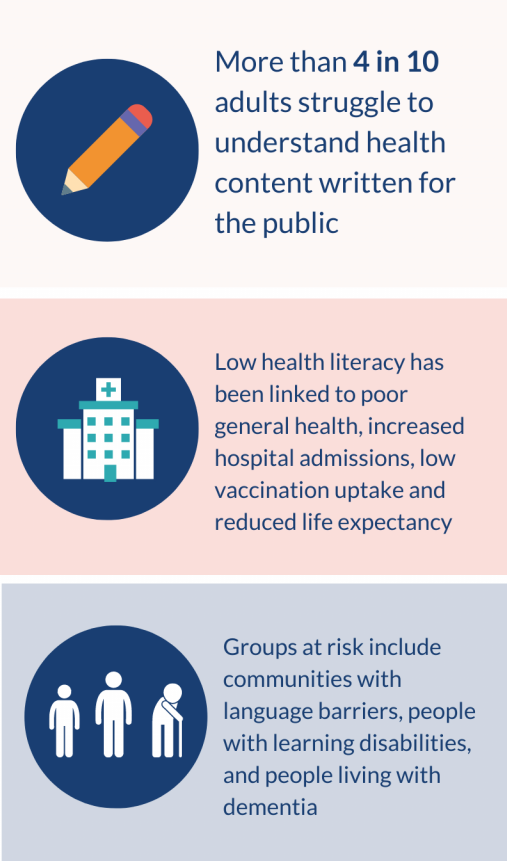
Low health literacy contributes to poor health

Health literacy is the ability to obtain, read, understand, and use healthcare information in order to make appropriate health decisions and follow instructions for treatment. There are multiple definitions of health literacy, in part because health literacy involves both the context (or setting) in which health literacy demands are made (e.g., health care, media, internet or fitness facility) and the skills that people bring to that situation.

Since health literacy is a primary contributing factor to health disparities, it is a continued and increasing concern for health professionals. The 2003 National Assessment of Adult Literacy (NAAL) conducted by the US Department of Education found that 36% of participants scored as either "basic" or "below basic" in terms of their health literacy and concluded that approximately 80 million Americans have limited health literacy. These individuals have difficulty with common health tasks including reading the label of a prescribed drug.

Several factors may influence health literacy. The following factors have been shown to strongly increase this risk: age (especially patients 65 years and older), limited English language proficiency or English as a second language, chronic conditions, less education, and lower socioeconomic status. Patients with low health literacy understand less about their medical conditions and treatments and overall report worse health status. Patients who struggle with substantial health literacy challenges often forego important health care such as vaccinations or annual screenings, and are more likely to miss appointments, misuse medication, prepare improperly for procedures, and even die prematurely.

Various interventions, such as simplifying information and illustrations, avoiding jargon, using "teach-back" methods, and encouraging patients' questions, have improved health behaviors in persons with low health literacy. The proportion of adults aged 18 and over in the U.S., in the year 2010, who reported that their health care providers always explained things so they could understand them was about 60.6%. This number increased 1% from 2007 to 2010. The Healthy People 2020 initiative of the United States Department of Health and Human Services (HHS) has included health literacy as a pressing new topic, with objectives for improving it in the decade to come.

In planning for Healthy People 2030 (the fifth edition of Healthy People), HHS issued a "Solicitation for Written Comments on an Updated Health Literacy Definition for Healthy People". Several proposals address the fact that "health literacy is multidimensional", being the result of a concerted effort that involves the individual seeking care or information, providers and caregivers, the complexity and demands of the system, and the use of plain language for communication.

== Definition ==
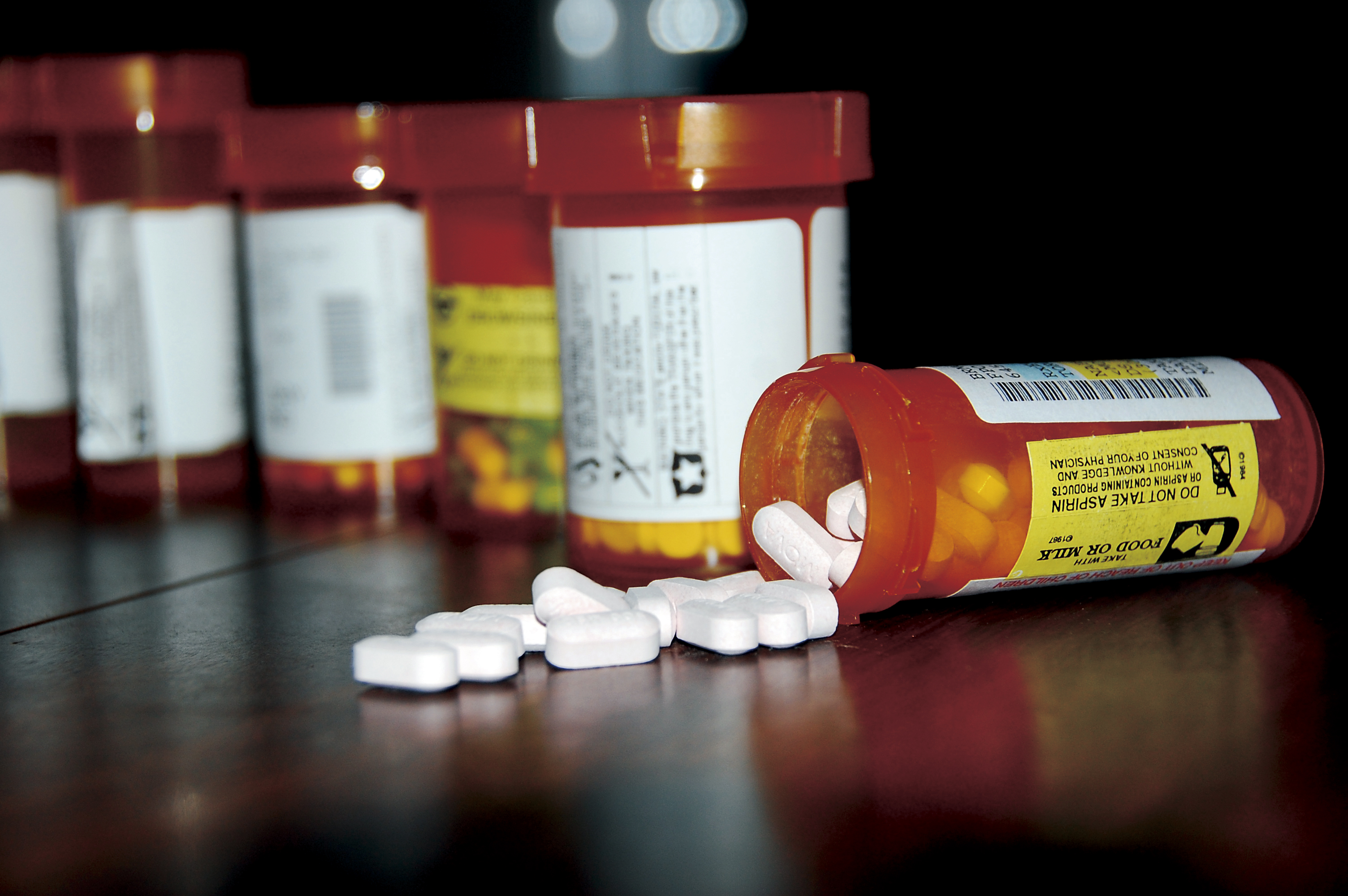
The ability to read and understand medication instructions is a form of health literacy.

The National Library of Medicine defined health literacy as:

"The degree to which individuals have the capacity to obtain, process, and understand basic health literacy information and services needed to make appropriate health decisions."

Health literacy encompasses a wide range of skills, and competencies that people develop over their lifetimes to seek out, comprehend, evaluate, and use health information and concepts to make informed choices, reduce health risks, and increase quality of life.

Another view of health literacy includes the ability to understand scientific concepts, content, and health research; skills in spoken, written, and online communication; critical interpretation of mass media messages; navigating systems of health care and governance; knowledge and use of community capital and resources; and using cultural and indigenous knowledge in health decision making. This view sees health literacy as one of the social determinants of health which can reduce inequities in health.

== Impact ==
Health literacy influences individuals' ability to obtain, understand, and use health information, which in turn affects their ability to make informed to make health decisions, and thus directly addresses health inequalities. Individuals with lower levels of health literacy live, disproportionately, in communities with lower socio-economic standing. A barrier to achieving adequate health literacy for these individuals is a lack of awareness, or understanding of, information and resources relevant to improving their health. This knowledge gap arises from both people being unable to understand information presented to them and clinical sources providing inadequate resources to address these literacy gaps. Inadequate health literacy can lead to misunderstanding medical instructions, medication errors, missed appointments, and other adverse health outcomes.

The levels of health literacy are considered adequate when the population has sufficient knowledge, skills, and confidence to guide their own health, and people are able to stay healthy, recover from illness, and live with disability or disease.

=== Lower literacy ===
Health literacy influences a person's ability to understand medical information, such as prescription instructions and treatment recommendations, which can directly affect their ability to follow medical advice and manage their health effectively.

Research shows that people with low health literacy may not understand medication instructions or dosage information, which can lead to medication errors and poor treatment outcomes. People with lower health literacy are also more likely to use emergency healthcare services and experience difficulties navigating healthcare systems — this means more emergency room visits, more hospitalizations, and higher healthcare costs.

Health literacy also affects communication between people and healthcare providers, not only when it comes to prescription and treatments, but in the ability of people needing care to ask questions, participate in decision-making, and understand medical advice, which in turn influence health outcomes. Further, limited health literacy is associated with lower participation in preventive healthcare behaviors, including cancer screening, vaccinations, and early medical consultation. These lower rates of preventive behaviors and delayed medical care can negatively affect health outcomes.

=== Higher literacy ===
People with higher health literacy are more likely to understand their medical conditions and engage in self-management behaviors, such as medication adherence, healthy lifestyle choices, and monitoring symptoms. Higher health literacy has also been associated with better quality of life, especially among people with chronic illnesses because it supports better self-management and use of healthcare.

Higher health literacy improves medication adherence, lifestyle changes (i.e., diet, exercise) and maintaining mental and physical well-being, symptom monitoring and management, disease knowledge, and access to healthcare resources.

== Characteristics ==
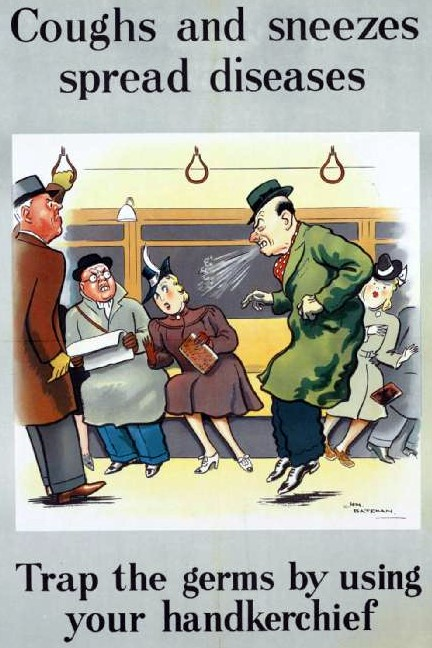
A poster about airborne disease transmission encouraging the use of a handkerchief to prevent the spread

=== Factors that contribute to health literacy ===
Many factors determine the health literacy level of health education materials or interventions: readability of the text, the patient's current state of health, language barriers between the clinician and patient, cultural appropriateness of the materials, format and style, sentence structure, use of illustrations, and numerous other factors.

A study of 69,000 patients conducted in 1995 by two US hospitals found that between 26% and 60% of patients could not understand medication directions, a standard informed consent form, or materials about scheduling an appointment. The 2003 National Assessment of Adult Literacy (NAAL) conducted by the US Department of Education found that 36% of participants scored as either "basic" or "below basic" in terms of their health literacy and concluded that approximately 80 million Americans have limited health literacy.

Results of a systematic review of the literature found that when limited English proficient (LEP) patients receive care from physicians who are fluent in the patients' preferred language, referred to as having language concordance, generally improves outcomes. These outcomes are consistent across patient-reported measures, such as patient satisfaction, and also more such as blood pressure for patients with diabetes.

=== Plain language ===
Plain language refers to the use of writing strategies that help readers find, understand, and apply information to fulfill their needs. It has a vital role to play in improving health literacy. In conjunction with readers education, provider cultural training, and system design, plain language helps people make more informed health choices.

Plain language is defined by the International Plain Language Federation as writing whose "wording, structure, and design are so clear that the intended readers can easily find what they need, understand what they find, and use that information."

Some key elements of plain language include:

- Organizing information so most important points come first
- Breaking complex information into understandable chunks
- Using simple language or language familiar to the reader
- Defining technical terms and acronyms
- Using active voice in subject-verb-object (SVO) sentences when subject/agent/topic coincide
- Varying sentence length and structure to avoid monotony
- Using lists and tables to make complex material easier to understand

The National Institute of Health (NIH) recommends that patient education materials be written at a 6th–7th grade reading level. The UK's National Institute for Health and Care Research (NIHR) recommends involving patients and non-academic members of the public in writing plain language summaries of research articles.

Large language models have been used to translate clinical documents into plain language. In a single-centre randomized trial of 300 neurosurgical outpatients, physician-reviewed AI-generated lay summaries of patients’ own reports, provided before the first consultation, were associated with higher patient-rated interaction quality and shorter consultations.

=== Assessment ===
There are several tests, which have verified reliability in the academic literature that can be administered in order to test one's health literacy. Some of these tests include the Medical Term Recognition Test (METER), which was developed in the United States (2 minute administration time) for the clinical setting. The METER includes many words from the Rapid Estimate of Adult Literacy in Medicine (REALM) test. The Short Assessment of Health Literacy in Spanish and English populations (SAHL-S&E) uses word recognition and multiple choice questions to test a person's comprehension. The CHC-Test measures Critical Health Competencies and consists of 72 items designed to test a person's understanding of medical concepts, literature searching, basic statistics, and design of experiments and samples.

Standardized measures of health literacy are the Newest Vital Sign (NVS), which asks people about a nutrition label, and the Test of Functional Health Literacy (TOFHLA), which asks test-takers to fill in 36 blanks in patient instructions for X-rays and a Medicaid application, from multiple choices, and 4 numbers in medicine dosage forms.

The European Health Literacy Population Survey

Following studies in a number of European countries demonstrating that health literacy is limited in a large proportion of the general population, and the publication of WHO's report Health Literacy: The solid facts (2013), WHO/Europe initiated the Action Network on Measuring Population and Organizational Health Literacy (M-POHL). 28 European countries are involved in M-POHL and measure health literacy in the population regularly. In the Health Literacy Survey 2019 (HLS19) 17 countries were involved. To measure general health literacy the instrument HLS-EU-Q12 - a short form of the original HLS-EU-Q47 instrument was used in this survey.

== Patient safety and outcomes ==
The impact of low health literacy has adverse effects on the process of treatment. The lack of health literacy affects all segments of the population. However, it is disproportionate in certain demographic groups, such as the elderly, ethnic minorities, recent immigrants, individuals facing homelessness, and persons with low general literacy. These populations have a higher risk of hospitalization, longer hospital stays, are less likely to comply with treatment, are more likely to make errors with medication, and are more ill when they initially seek medical care.

The mismatch between a clinician's communication of content and a patient's ability to understand that content can lead to medication errors and adverse medical outcomes. Health literacy skills are not only a problem in the general population. Health care professionals (doctors, nurses, public health workers) can also have poor health literacy skills, such as a reduced ability to clearly explain health issues to patients and the public. In addition to tailoring the content of what health professionals communicate to their patients, a well arranged layout, pertinent illustrations, and intuitive format of written materials can improve the usability of health care literature. This in turn can help in effective communication between healthcare providers and their patients.

Outcomes of low levels of health literacy also include relative expenditures on health services. Because individuals with low health literacy are more likely to have adverse health statuses, their use of health services is also increased. This trend is compounded by other risk factors of low health literacy, including poverty. Homelessness and housing insecurity can hinder good health and recovery in attempts to better health circumstances, causing the exacerbation of poor health conditions. In these cases, a variety of health services may be used repeatedly as health issues are prolonged. Thus overall expenditures on health services is greater among populations with low health literacy and poor health. These costs may be left to individuals and families to pay which may further burden health conditions, or the costs may be left to a variety of institutions which in turn has broader implications for government funding and health care systems.

Low levels of health literacy is responsible for 3–5% of healthcare cost—approximately $143 to 7,798 per individual within the healthcare system.

=== Risk identification ===
Identifying a patient as having low health literacy is essential for a healthcare professional to conform their health intervention in a way that the patient will understand. When patients with low health literacy receive care that is tailored to their more limited medical knowledge base, results have shown that health behaviors drastically improve. This has been seen with: correct medication use and dosage, utilizing health screenings, as well as increased exercise and smoking cessation. Effective visual aids have shown to help supplement the information communicated by the doctor in the office. In particular, easily readable brochures and videos have shown to be very effective. Healthcare professionals can use many methods to attain patients' health literacy. A multitude of tests used during research studies and three minute assessments commonly used in doctors offices are examples of the variety of tests healthcare professionals can use to better understand their patients' health literacy.

Asking simple single-item questions, such as "How confident are you in filling out medical forms by yourself?", helps to discern a patient's thoughts on interacting with their healthcare provider and understanding their health condition.

==== Homelessness ====
Individuals facing homelessness constitute a population that holds intersectional identities, is highly mobile, and is often out of the public eye. Thus the difficulty of conducting research on this group has resulted in little information regarding homelessness as a condition that has increased risk of low health literacy levels among individuals. Nonetheless, studies that do exist indicate that homeless individuals experience increased prevalence of low health literacy and poor health—both physical and mental—due to vulnerabilities brought on by the insecurity of basic needs among homeless individuals. The combination of poor health and homelessness has been found to increase the risk for further decline in health status and increased housing insecurity, all of which is highly affected by low levels of health literacy.

=== Intervention ===
In order to be understood by patients with insufficient health literacy, health professionals must intervene to provide clear and concise information that can be more easily understood. Avoidance of medical jargon, illustrations of important concepts, and confirming information by a "teach back" method have shown to be effective tools to communicating essential health topics with health illiterate patients. A program called "Ask Me 3" is designed to bring public and physician attention to this issue, by letting patients know that they should ask three questions each time they talk to a doctor, nurse, or pharmacist:

- What is my main problem?
- What do I need to do?
- Why is it important for me to do this?

There have also been large-scale efforts to improve health literacy. For example, a public information program by the US Department of Health and Human Services encourages patients to improve healthcare quality and avoid errors by asking questions about health conditions and treatment. Additionally, the IROHLA (Intervention Research on Health Literacy of the Ageing population) project, funded by the European Union (EU), seeks to develop evidence-based guidelines for policy and practice to improve health literacy of the ageing population in EU member states. The project has developed a framework and identified and validated interventions which together constitute a comprehensive approach of addressing health literacy needs of the elderly.

=== Impact on specific conditions ===
==== Diabetes ====
Low health literacy is associated with poorer knowledge of diabetes and leads to a lower quality self-management of the condition.

== eHealth literacy ==
eHealth literacy describes an individual's ability to search for, access, comprehend, and appraise desired health information from electronic sources and to then use such information to attempt to address a particular health problem. It has become an important topic of research due to the increasing use of the internet for health information seeking and health information distribution. Stellefson (2011) states, "8 out of 10 Internet users report that they have at least once looked online for health information, making it the third most popular Web activity next to checking email and using search engines in terms of activities that almost everybody has done." Though in recent years, individuals may have gained access to a multitude of health information via the Internet, access alone does not ensure that proper search skills and techniques are being used to find the most relevant online and electronic resources. As the line between a reputable medical source and an amateur opinion can often be blurred, the ability to differentiate between the two is important.

Health literacy requires a combination of several different literacy skills in order to facilitate eHealth promotion and care. Six core skills are delineated by an eHealth literacy model referred to as the Lily model. The Lily model's six literacies are organized into two central types: analytic and context-specific. Analytic type literacies are those skills that can be applied to a broad range of sources, regardless of topic or content (i.e., skills that can also be applied to shopping or researching a term paper in addition to health) whereas context-specific skills are those that are contextualized within a specific problem domain (can solely be applied to health). The six literacies are listed below, the first three of the analytic type and the latter three of the context-specific:

- Traditional literacy
- Media literacy
- Information literacy
- Computer literacy
- Scientific literacy
- Health literacy

According to Norman (2006), both analytical and context-specific literacy skills are "required to fully engage with electronic health resources." As the World Wide Web and technological innovations are more and more becoming a part of the healthcare environment, it is important for information technology to be properly utilized to promote health and deliver health care effectively.The utilization of digital health information resources and the integration of digital interactions with healthcare providers offer significant advantages, with the potential to enhance healthcare system efficiency, quality, and accessibility, all while empowering patients.

It has also been suggested that the move towards patient-centered care and the greater use of technology for self-care and self-management requires higher health literacy on the part of the patient. This has been noted in several research studies, for example among adolescent patients with obesity.

== Improvement ==
=== Incorporate information through the university level ===
The United States Department of Health and Human Services created a National Action Plan to Improve Health Literacy. One of the goals of the National Action Plan is to incorporate health and science information in childcare and education through the university level. The target is to educate people at an early stage; that way individuals are raised with health literacy and will have a better quality of life. The earlier an individual is exposed to health literacy skills the better for the person and the community.

Programs such as Head Start and Women, Infants, and Children (WIC) have impacted society, especially the low-income population. Head Start provides low-income children and their families early childhood education, nutrition, and health screenings. Health literacy is integrated in the program for both children and parents through the education given to the individuals. WIC serves low-income pregnant women and new mothers by supplying them with food, health care referrals, and nutrition education. Programs like these help improve the health literacy of both the parent and the child, creating a more knowledgeable community with health education.

While programs like Head Start and WIC have been working to improve the health literacy of their specific populations, additional resources are focused on the education of children and young adults. Now, more adolescents are getting involved with their own health care, and education to make informed decisions.

Many schools in the United States incorporate a health class in their curriculum. These classes are an opportunity to facilitate and develop health literacy in today's children and adolescents by teaching skills of how to read food labels, the meaning of common medical terms, the structure of the human body, and education on the most prevalent diseases in the United States.

=== Framework and potential intervention points ===
Three potential intervention points are culture and society, the health system, and the education system. Health outcomes and costs are the products of the health literacy developed during diversity of exposure to these three potential intervention points. While these potential intervention points include interactions such as those of individuals and the education systems that they are engaged with, their health systems, and societal factors as they relate to health literacy, these points are not components of a causal model.

Cultural and societal influences are a significant intervention point for health literacy development, referring to shared ideas, meanings, and values that influence an individual's beliefs and attitudes. As interactions with healthcare systems often first occur at the family level, deeply rooted beliefs and values can shape the experience. Components that reflect the development of health literacy both culturally and societally are native language, socioeconomic status, gender, race, and ethnicity, as well as mass media exposure.

The health system is an intervention point in the health literacy framework. For the purposes of this framework, health literacy refers to an individual's interaction with people performing health-related activities in settings such as hospitals, clinics, physician's offices, home health care, public health agencies, and insurers.

In the United States, the education system consists of K–12 curricula. In addition to this standard educational setting, adult education programs allow individuals to develop traditional literacy skills founded in comprehension and real-world application of knowledge via reading and writing. Tools for educational development provided by these systems impact an individual's capacity to obtain specific knowledge regarding health. Reflecting components of traditional literacy such as cultural and conceptual knowledge, oral literacy (listening and speaking), print literacy (reading and writing), and numeracy, education systems are also potential intervention points for health literacy development.

=== Development of a health literacy program ===
A successful health literacy program will have many goals that all work together to improve health literacy. Many people assume these goals should communicate health information to the general public; however, in order to be successful, the goals should not only communicate with people but also take into account social and environmental factors that influence lifestyle choices. A good example of this is the movement to end smoking. When a health literacy program is put into place where only the negative side effects of smoking are told to the general public it is doomed to fail. However, when there is a larger program put in – one that includes strategies outlining how to quit smoking, raises tobacco prices, reduces access to tobacco by minors, and reflects the social unacceptability of smoking – it will be much more effective.

The U.S. Department of Health and Human Services suggests a National Action Plan to implement a comprehensive Health Literacy Program. They include seven goals:

1. Develop and disseminate health and safety information that is accurate, accessible, and actionable
2. Promote changes in the health care system that improve health information, communication, informed decision making, and access to health services
3. Incorporate accurate, standards-based, and developmentally appropriate health and science information and curricula in child care and education through the university level
4. Support and expand local efforts to provide adult education, English language instruction, and culturally and linguistically appropriate health information services in the community
5. Build partnerships, develop guidance, and change policies
6. Increase basic research and the development, implementation, and evaluation of practices and interventions to improve health literacy
7. Increase the dissemination and use of evidence-based health literacy practices and interventions

These goals should be taken into account when implementing a health literacy program.

The goals for the outcomes of a Health Literacy Program are:

- Promoting and protect health and prevent disease
- Understand, interpret, and analyze health information
- Apply health information over a variety of life events and situations
- Navigate the healthcare system
- Actively participate in encounters with healthcare professionals and workers
- Understand and give consent
- Understand and advocate for rights

In the creation of a program, it is also important to ensure that all parties involved in health contexts are on the same page. To do this, programs may choose to include the training of case managers, health advocates, and even doctors and nurses. Due to the common overestimations of health literacy levels of patients, the education of health literacy topics and training in the identification of low health literacy in patients may be able to create significant positive change in the understanding of health messages. The health belief model has been used in the training of health professionals in order to share insight on the knowledge that it has been shown to most likely change health perceptions and behaviors of their patients. The use of the health belief model can provide basis for which patient health literacy may grow. The training of health workers may be seen as a "work around intervention" but is still a viable option and opportunity for mediating the negative outcomes of low health literacy. Effective health literacy programs are created with cultural competency, and individuals working within health institutions can support individuals with low health literacy by being culturally competent themselves.

In working to improve the health literacy of individuals, a multitude of approaches may be taken. Systematic reviews of studied interventions reveal that one works to improve health literacy in one patient may not work for another patient. In fact, some interventions were found to worse health literacy in individuals. Nonetheless, studies have illuminated general approaches that help individuals understand health messages. A review of 26 studies concluded that "intensive mixed-strategy interventions focusing on self-management" and "theory basis, pilot testing, emphasis on skill building, and delivery by a health professional" do aid in increasing levels of health literacy among patients. Another study revealed that programs aimed at targeting more than one behavior through increased health literacy are no less successful than programs with a single focus. The importance of dignity and respect is emphasized when creating programs for increasing health literacy of vulnerable individuals. In intervention programs created for homeless individuals in specific, it has been found that "successful intervention programs use aggressive outreach to bring comprehensive social and health services to sites where homeless people congregate and allow clients to set the limits and pace of engagement". A social justice model is recommended for homeless individuals which is based on shared support of the community and their health literacy needs by those who provide services for this underserved group as well as the professionals who create and implement health literacy interventions.

=== Role of libraries ===
Through their mission to provide access to knowledge, libraries play an important role in health literacy. Wide and open access to health information is a prerequisite for being able to understand and use that information, and libraries often advocate for and provide access to these resources. Libraries also function as trusted social spaces where people can discuss and inquire about information related to health. By helping people access and understand reliable, high-quality health information, librarians can contribute to improving people's health literacy.

Public libraries have increasingly recognized that they can play a role in health literacy. Initiatives by libraries that focused on health literacy have included running educational programs, fostering partnerships with health organizations, computer training for older adults, and using outreach efforts. Library outreach often addresses underrepresented or vulnerable groups who have a higher risk of certain diseases and a lower general level of health literacy. Health literacy efforts for these groups by public libraries include translating health information for and facilitating potentially different cultural attitudes of refugees and immigrant populations, and reaching out to low-income and uninsured people.

Medical libraries located in healthcare or higher education settings work with healthcare professionals, medical students, and patients. Health literacy efforts by medical librarians can include raising awareness of the barriers of health literacy faced by patients, and training professionals in communication strategies they might require such as active listening and the use of plain language. Medical librarians can also support medical students and people participating in continuing professional development in tasks that require information literacy skills, such as retrieving biomedical literature and practicing evidence-based medicine.

Various medical libraries have made an effort to introduce health literacy programs by attempting to define the concept to include the librarian's role as including a set of abilities needed to recognize a health information need, identify likely information sources and use them to retrieve relevant information, and assess the quality of the information and its applicability to a specific health situation.

=== Alternative approaches ===
A study published in the American Journal of Obstetrics and Gynecology in 2018 suggested an alternative method of addressing health knowledge deficits due to low health literacy. This alternative method is the use of "culturally-related/accepted" music and singing amongst low-literacy populations. In the example of this study, the music with locally written song lyrics of health messages was shown to increase maternal health knowledge, and more specifically, antenatal care.

== History ==
The field of health literacy emerged from two groups of experts: physicians, health providers such as nurses and health educators; and Adult Basic Education (ABE) and English as a second language (ESL) practitioners in the field of education. Physicians and nurses are a source of patient comprehension and compliance studies. Adult Basic Education / English for Speakers of Languages Other Than English (ABE/ESOL) specialists study and design interventions to help people develop reading, writing, and conversation skills and increasingly infuse curricula with health information to promote better health literacy. A range of approaches to adult education brings health literacy skills to people in traditional classroom settings, as well as where they work and live.

=== Biomedical approach ===
The biomedical approach to health literacy that became dominant in the United States during the 1980s and 1990s often depicted individuals as lacking health literacy or "suffering" from low health literacy. This approach assumed that recipients are passive in their possession and reception of health literacy and believed that models of literacy and health literacy are politically neutral and universally applicable. This approach is found lacking when placed in the context of broader ecological, critical, and cultural approaches to health. This approach has produced, and continues to reproduce, numerous correlational studies.

== See also ==
- Asian Health Literacy Association
- Global health
- Health economics
- Health promotion
- Health system
- Mental health literacy
- mHealth
- Numeracy § Innumeracy and risk perception in health decision-making (Health numeracy)
- Human nutrition
- Occupational safety and health literacy
- Patient safety
- Universal health care

== Sources ==
- Nutbeam, D. (2000). "Health literacy as a public health goal: A challenge for contemporary health education and communication strategies into the 21st century". Health Promotion International. 15 (3): 259–267. doi:10.1093/heapro/15.3.259.
- Pleasant, A.; Kuruvilla, S. (2008). "A tale of two health literacies? Public health and clinical approaches to health literacy". Health Promot Int. 23 (2). Health Promotion International: 152–9. doi:10.1093/heapro/dan001. PMID 18223203. Archived from the original on 2008-10-07.
- Ratzan S. C. (2001). "Health literacy: Communication for the public good". Health Promotion International. 16 (2): 207–214. doi:10.1093/heapro/16.2.207. PMID 11356759.
- Rootman, I. & Wharf-Higgins, J. (2007), Literacy and Health: Implications for Active Living (PDF), WellSpring, p. 4
- "Health Literacy Improvement". health.gov. July 24, 2008. Archived from the original on June 11, 2018.
- Rudd, R., Moeykens, B. Colton, TC. (1999). Health and literacy: A review of medical and public health literature. In J. Comings, B. Garners, & C. Smith, eds. Annual Review of Adult Learning and Literacy, Volume I. New York, NY: Jossey-Bass.
- Zarcadoolas C.; Pleasant A.; Greer D. (2005). "Understanding health literacy: An expanded model". Health Promotion International. 20 (2): 195–203. doi:10.1093/heapro/dah609. PMID 15788526.
- Zarcadoolas, C., Pleasant, A., & Greer, D. (2006). Advancing health literacy: A framework for understanding and action. Jossey-Bass: San Francisco, CA.
