= Closed-loop communication =

Communication technique in which every received message is confirmed by the sender

Closed-loop communication is a communication technique used to avoid misunderstandings. Under this technique, any sent message is repeated back to the sender who then confirms the accuracy or indicates an error. In the case that the repeated message is incorrect, the sender will then repeat the cycle by restating the original message.

If the person sending the message does not receive a reply, they must repeat it until the receiver starts closing the loop. To gain the attention of the receiver, the sender can use the receiver's name or functional position, touch their shoulder, etc.

== Background ==
Closed-loop communication originated from early two-way radio communication protocol, particularly as used in the military and aviation. The goal was to effectively share critical information with little margin for error. This was especially important when those transmitting and receiving the messages were separated by distance and not communicating face-to-face.

In engineering organizations, closing the loop means establishing an informal communication channel with another individual or organization. The expression "going open loop" may be used to express the idea that someone has lost discipline and is acting out of control.

== Procedure ==
Closed-loop communication is a form of communication that revolves around a three-step process:

1. Sending a message.
2. Receiving the message.
3. Verifying the message.

Closed-loop communication may be conceptualized as a circle. If the circle is left open, then anything can get in. In the case of verbal communication, there may be misinformation, distractions, etc. However, when the circle is completely closed, there is much less of a chance for anything to get in, leaving fewer chances for a mistake. The process of participating in this form of communication is called "closing the loop".

== Applications ==
Closed-loop communication can be beneficial in many settings, and can be used to create an environment of improved interpersonal communication, effectiveness, accuracy, and team bonding. It is most often used in stressful environments in which vital information has to be conveyed.

=== Aviation ===
The aviation profession uses closed-loop communication in air traffic control and also within an aircrew known as crew resource management. Adopting this form of communication has minimized loss of separation, improved safety, and resulted in fewer errors.

Research has found that most flight accidents have been due to insufficient communication as opposed to technical failures, lack of knowledge, or pilot error. Crew resource management protocols have helped improve communication, problem-solving, decision making, and situational awareness.

=== Healthcare ===
In medical contexts, closed-loop communication is seen in the check-back method and modified in the teach-back method. In the latter, the information is repeated in the recipients own words to demonstrate understanding.

In medical scenarios, an open communication loop can lead to incorrect medication doses, misunderstanding of care instructions, and a general lack of understanding. About 30% of successful lawsuits regarding incapacitated or dead patients have cited miscommunication as an issue, according to Control Risk Insurance Company.
