= Psychological literacy =

Capacity to use knowledge from psychology

Psychological literacy is "the general capacity to adaptively and intentionally apply psychology to meet personal, professional, and societal needs" (Cranney, Botwood and Morris, 2012). This includes thinking, acting, and communicating effectively using psychological science. A psychologically literate person uses psychological concepts to understand their own behavior and the behavior of others. They use this knowledge to make informed decisions, solve problems, and communicate.

Most research about psychological literacy focuses on its role in learning psychology at university. Psychological literacy is often connected with responsible citizenship and using psychological knowledge to benefit individuals and society. However, disagreement exists between researchers about the best way psychological literacy should be measured and conceptualised.

== History ==
Boneau (1990) generated a list of the top 100 concepts and vocabulary in psychology as a first approximation of psychological literacy. In 2010, McGovern et al. argued the concept was more complex than knowing key psychological ideas, and proposed that psychological literacy consists of nine domains of knowledge, skill and conduct that psychology graduates should develop. These included evaluating information with scientific reasoning, using psychology to solve real-world issues, acting ethically and reflecting critically on their own and other people’s behaviour. McGovern et al. used the term psychologically literate citizen for someone who uses these skills in an ethical and responsible manner.

In 2012, Cranney, Botwood and Morris defined psychological literacy as “the general capacity...to meet personal, professional and societal needs”. This contrasts with McGovern et al.’s approach of defining the concept as a group of separate domains of knowledge, skill and conduct. According to a 2022 systematic review of 112 publications, both approaches were still widely used: 52.7% described it as a general capacity and 69.6% described it as a group of capabilities and 40.9% used both approaches. Some publications used both definitions, which caused the overlap in percentages. The systematic review’s findings are limited to that body of literature rather than a global consensus, as it only examined English-language publications.

== Conceptualisation ==
Some definitions of psychological literacy emphasise applicability to everyday life, whilst other conceptualisations concentrate more narrowly on psychological literacy within the context of the competences obtained through studying psychology. This difference is reflected in the two main approaches. Instead of requiring a set list of qualities, the general-capacity approach focuses on applying psychology to societal, personal and professional contexts.

In contrast, McGovern et al.’s group approach identifies nine areas that psychology graduates are expected to develop. These include knowledge of psychology, scientific evaluation of information, creative and sceptical problem-solving, application of psychological principles, ethical conduct, information and technological literacy, effective communication, respect for diversity, and reflection on behaviour and mental processes. McGovern et al. proposed these nine domains as guidance for university curriculum and learning outcomes.

Although psychological literacy and psychologically literate citizenship are related concepts, psychologically literate citizenship also includes the ethical use of psychological knowledge for the good of wider society. However, publications do not always make a consistent distinction between the terms.

== Psychology education ==
Psychological literacy is often framed as an intended outcome of learning psychology at university. This was the case for 95 out of 112 publications (84.8%) in the 2022 systematic review. This shows the focus of research is concentrated in university education, but this does not prove that psychological literacy is developed through pursuing a psychology degree.

Psychology students may value the proposed skills despite being unfamiliar with the term. Harris et al.’s cross sectional survey showed that only 21 of the 117 psychology undergraduates had previously heard of psychological literacy. When all participants were asked to interpret what it meant, 74 mentioned psychological knowledge and 38 included real world applicability. After being shown the associated skills, students mostly rated them as important. Harris et al. therefore suggested that psychological literacy may already be in use to guide curriculum design, despite students not being explicitly taught about that concept.

== Measurement ==
Researchers disagree about the specific knowledge, skills and values that form psychological literacy. This means measures may assess different things under the same label. Out of the 112 publications in Cranney et al.’s systematic review, only 14 (12.5%) used measurement beyond course assessments.

Roberts, Heritage and Gasson used two student samples from an Australian university to demonstrate this problem. Short self-ratings and longer assessments were completed by participants, intended to represent the nine areas identified by McGovern et al. There was only a weak to moderate relationship between measures of the same label, meaning they were not capturing the same underlying ability. These findings raised concerns about whether the nine domains are a stable construct and whether they represent graduate skills rather than psychology specific abilities.

These concerns about inconsistency and unclear definition also exist in other research investigating psychological literacy measurement. A 2020 systematic narrative review found six undergraduate measurement studies. Four used McGovern et al.’s domains, but only knowledge, application and communication were fairly consistently measured. Only three provided evidence that their measures evaluated psychological literacy. The reviewers recommended tracking students over time, performance based metrics and more precise definitions.

The disagreement extended beyond the validity of measurement itself. Newell, Chur-Hansen and Strelan (2021) examined the definitions of psychological literacy from 35 sources. Only five characteristics were present in more than half (knowledge, application, employment contexts, science and the individual). They did not reject psychological literacy, but came to the conclusion that its definition and assessment needed to be improved with feedback from teachers, students and employers.

== See also ==
- Emotional literacy
- Mental health literacy
- Psychological literacy (Wikiversity)
- Scientific literacy
