= Local feature size =

Local feature size refers to several related concepts in computer graphics and computational geometry for measuring the size of a geometric object near a particular point.

- Given a smooth manifold $M$, the local feature size at any point $x \in M$ is the distance between $x$ and the medial axis of $M$.
- Given a planar straight-line graph, the local feature size at any point $x$ is the radius of the smallest closed ball centered at $x$ which intersects any two disjoint features (vertices or edges) of the graph.
Definitions of local feature size. In each case, the local feature size at the blue points is the radius of the associated blue circle.

Local feature size for a smooth manifold (black) with medial axis (red).

Local feature size for a planar straight-line graph.

== See also ==
- Nearest neighbour function
