= Health information-seeking behaviour =

Health information-seeking behaviour (HISB), also known as health information seeking, health seeking behaviour or health information behaviour, refers to how people look for information about health and illness. HISB is a key strategy for many people to understand their health problems and to cope with illness. Recently, thanks to the development of the technologies and networks, people have a trend of seeking health information on the Internet. Particularly, when it comes to the following scenarios, people tend to carry out online HISB:

- Encountering health issues
- Received conflicting information
- The cause is relevant to known people (such as family members and friends)
- Out of curiosity

== Definition ==
Health information-seeking behaviour refers to the various ways people look for information about health and illness. HISB can take different forms, for example actively looking for health information or passively receiving it while doing something else.

== Impact on health ==
Health information seeking not only affects knowledge but can also change how people behave before, during and after their illness.

== By condition ==
=== Inflammatory bowel disease ===
Among people with inflammatory bowel disease (ulcerative colitis or Crohn’s disease), the information that is most commonly looked for usually concerns treatments and medication for their condition. Further information needs typically concerns basic information about inflammatory bowel disease, managing the condition and daily life, and its effects on sexuality and reproductive health.

== See also ==
- Health literacy
