= Norman Robert Campbell =

British physicist (1880–1949)

Norman Robert Campbell (1880–1949) was an English physicist and philosopher of science.

== Early life ==
Norman Robert Campbell was born in 1880. He was the son of William Middleton Campbell, Governor of the Bank of England, and his wife Edith Agneta Bevan. He was educated at Eton College and at Trinity College, Cambridge, graduating B.A. in 1902.

== Career ==
Campbell became a fellow at Trinity College, Cambridge in 1902. He was also a research assistant at the Cavendish Laboratory under the direction of J. J. Thomson. He became an honorary fellow in physics research at Leeds University in 1913.

During World War I, Campbell was at the National Physical Laboratory, working under Clifford Paterson. They investigated spark discharge in internal combustion engines. He then worked from 1919 to 1944 as a member of the research staff at the Hirst Research Centre of the General Electric Company England, set up in Wembley Middlesex in 1919. While at Hirst Research he encouraged unqualified staff to further their scientific knowledge by the loan and gift of books used during his own studies.

== Works ==
Campbell was an early supporter of Albert Einstein's theory of relativity, and was characterized as "the only British physicist to adopt a broadly Einsteinian reading of relativity before 1911".

Campbell's 1921 book, What Is Science?, was written with the professed aim of encouraging the study of science in the classes of the Workers' Educational Association. This book is a short introduction to the philosophy of science aimed at a lay audience. Other than attempting to answer the question raised in the title of the book, it tries to answer some of the central questions of the philosophy of science, such as "what is a law of nature?" and "what is measurement".

Other publications by Campbell include Modern Electrical Theory (1907 with supplementary chapters 1921-23), The Principles of Electricity (1912) and An Account of the Principles of Measurement and Calculation (1928). His most important work on the philosophy of science was his Physics: The Elements, published in 1919 (reissued by Dover as Foundations of Science: The Philosophy of Theory and Experiment in 1957). This work consists of the first two parts of a planned five-part work that was never completed. In this book Campbell developed his thesis that a critical analysis of science might not require any philosophy at all, but that an investigation of the meaning of reality and truth in science as opposed to metaphysics might be fruitful. Campbell believed that what might be considered "truth" in the realm of science might not be applicable at all in other fields.

- Campbell, N. R. (1907). Modern Electrical Theory. Cambridge University Press.
- Campbell, N. R. (1920). Physics: The Elements. Cambridge University Press.
- Campbell, R. N. (1921). What is Science?. Methuen & Co.
- Campbell, R. N. (1921). Modern Electrical Theory: Supplementary Chapters. Cambridge University Press.

== Views ==
Campbell had a particular regard for the ideas and teaching ability of Michael Faraday. He considered that the fundamental function of a scientific theory was to develop and explain laws, defined as uniformities discovered by hypothesis, observation and experiment and verifiable from experience. He also maintained that, to be useful, such laws should display some analogy to other known laws developed by the scientific method.

== Death ==
Campbell died in 1949.

== See also ==
- Campbell's theorem
