= Moment measure =

In probability and statistics, a moment measure is a mathematical quantity, function or, more precisely, measure that is defined in relation to mathematical objects known as point processes, which are types of stochastic processes often used as mathematical models of physical phenomena representable as randomly positioned points in time, space or both. Moment measures generalize the idea of (raw) moments of random variables, hence they arise often in the study of point processes and related fields.

An example of a moment measure is the first moment measure of a point process, often called the mean measure or intensity measure, which gives the expected or average number of points of the point process being located in some region of space. In other words, if the number of points of a point process located in some region of space is a random variable, then the first moment measure corresponds to the first moment of this random variable.

Moment measures feature prominently in the study of point processes as well as the related fields of stochastic geometry and spatial statistics whose applications are found in numerous scientific and engineering disciplines such as biology, geology, physics, and telecommunications.

== Point process notation ==
Point processes are mathematical objects that are defined on some underlying mathematical space. Since these processes are often used to represent collections of points randomly scattered in physical space, time or both, the underlying space is usually d-dimensional Euclidean space denoted here by $\textstyle \textbf{R}^{ d}$, but they can be defined on more abstract mathematical spaces.

Point processes have a number of interpretations, which is reflected by the various types of point process notation. For example, if a point $\textstyle x$ belongs to or is a member of a point process, denoted by $\textstyle {N}$, then this can be written as:

$$\textstyle x\in {N},$$

and represents the point process being interpreted as a random set. Alternatively, the number of points of $\textstyle {N}$ located in some Borel set $\textstyle B$ is often written as:

$$\textstyle {N}(B),$$

which reflects a random measure interpretation for point processes. These two notations are often used in parallel or interchangeably.

== Definitions ==
=== n-th power of a point process ===
For some integer $\textstyle n=1,2,\dots$, the $\textstyle n$-th power of a point process $\textstyle {N}$ is defined as:

$${N}^n(B_1\times\cdots\times B_n)= \prod_{i=1}^n{N}(B_i)$$

where $\textstyle B_1,...,B_n$ is a collection of not necessarily disjoint Borel sets (in $\textstyle \textbf{R}^{ d}$), which form a $\textstyle n$-fold Cartesian product of sets denoted by $B_1\times\cdots\times B_n$. The symbol $\textstyle \Pi$ denotes standard multiplication.

The notation $\textstyle {N}(B_i)$ reflects the interpretation of the point process $\textstyle {N}$ as a random measure.

The $\textstyle n$-th power of a point process $\textstyle {N}$ can be equivalently defined as:

$${N}^{n}(B_1\times\cdots\times B_n)= \sum_{(x_1,\dots, x_n)\in {N} } \prod_{i=1}^n \mathbf{1}_{B_i}(x_i)$$

where summation is performed over all $\textstyle n$-tuples of (possibly repeating) points, and $\textstyle \mathbf{1}$ denotes an indicator function such that $\textstyle \mathbf{1}_{B_1}$ is a Dirac measure. This definition can be contrasted with the definition of the n-factorial power of a point process for which each n-tuples consists of n distinct points.

=== n-th moment measure ===
The $\textstyle n$-th moment measure is defined as:

$$M^n(B_1\times\ldots\times B_n)=E [{N}^n(B_1\times\ldots\times B_n)],$$

where the E denotes the expectation (operator) of the point process $\textstyle {N}$. In other words, the n-th moment measure is the expectation of the n-th power of some point process.

The $\textstyle n\,$th moment measure of a point process $\textstyle {N}$ is equivalently defined as:

$$\int_{\textbf{R}^{n d}}f(x_1,\dots,x_n)  M^n(dx_1,\dots,dx_n)=E \left[ \sum_{(x_1,\dots,x_n)\in {N} } f(x_1,\dots,x_n)   \right],$$

where $\textstyle f$ is any non-negative measurable function on $\textstyle \textbf{R}^{n d}$ and the sum is over $\textstyle n$-tuples of points for which repetition is allowed.

=== First moment measure ===
For some Borel set B, the first moment of a point process N is:

$$M^1(B)=E [{N}(B)],$$

where $\textstyle M^1$ is known, among other terms, as the intensity measure or mean measure, and is interpreted as the expected or average number of points of $\textstyle {N}$ found or located in the set $\textstyle B$.

=== Second moment measure ===
The second moment measure for two Borel sets $\textstyle A$ and $\textstyle B$ is:

$$M^2(A\times B)=E [{N}(A){N}(B)],$$

which for a single Borel set $\textstyle B$ becomes

$$M^2(B\times B)=(E [{N}(B)])^2+\text{Var}[{N}(B)],$$

where $\textstyle \text{Var}[{N}(B)]$ denotes the variance of the random variable $\textstyle {N}(B)$.

The previous variance term alludes to how moments measures, like moments of random variables, can be used to calculate quantities like the variance of point processes. A further example is the covariance of a point process $\textstyle {N}$ for two Borel sets $\textstyle A$ and $\textstyle B$, which is given by:

$$\text{Cov}[{N}(A),{N}(B)]=M^2(A\times B)-M^1(A)M^1(B)$$

== Example: Poisson point process ==
For a general Poisson point process with intensity measure $\textstyle \Lambda$ the first moment measure is:

$$M^1(B)=\Lambda(B),$$

which for a homogeneous Poisson point process with constant intensity $\textstyle \lambda$ means:

$$M^1(B)=\lambda|B|,$$

where $\textstyle |B|$ is the length, area or volume (or more generally, the Lebesgue measure) of $\textstyle B$.

For the Poisson case with measure $\textstyle \Lambda$ the second moment measure defined on the product set $(B \times B)$ is:

$$M^2(B \times B)=\Lambda(B)+\Lambda(B)^2.$$

which in the homogeneous case reduces to

$$M^2(B \times B)=\lambda|B|+(\lambda|B|)^2.$$

== See also ==
- Factorial moment
- Factorial moment measure
- Moment
