= Florida Writers Association =

Founded in 2001, the Florida Writers Association (FWA) is a nonprofit 501(c)(6). It is an all-volunteer organization. It describes its purpose as "Writers Helping Writers".

== Founding and early years ==
Florida Writers Association was incorporated and designated a 501(c)(6) organization on May 14, 2001 by founder Glenda Ivey. Other founding members: Vicki M. Taylor and Weslynn McAllister were instrumental in the formation of the only (at the time) Florida non-profit "dedicated to helping writers of all genres, published or not." Glenda Ivey served as the first president, with Vicki M. Taylor as vice-president and Rachel Lisi as secretary-treasurer. Writers Helping Writers began with the task of supporting local writers in their communities improve their writing, learn about publishing, and begin promoting their work. To this end, it was decided to appoint Regional Directors (who would also serve Board Members) to grow local groups. Vicki M. Taylor, Caryn Suarez, and Doug Dillon established one or more 'Palm Groups' to meet once a month in the areas of Tampa, Jacksonville, and Orlando respectively. The meetings were led by appointed Group Leaders and included workshops, panel discussions, writing critiques, screenwriting, and poetry. The groups also worked together to hold book fairs and book signings in different locations. Contact with the growing membership that first year was through a twenty-page newsletter called Florida Palm Magazine mailed to members' homes. On its one-year anniversary in May 2002, FWA had 129 members, ten Regional Directors, and eight Palm Groups in Jacksonville, Tampa, Orlando, Lake Wales, St. Petersburg, New Port Richey, and Saint Augustine.

Early Group Leaders - Freda Gower Ward and Sheila McNaughton, St. Petersburg Palm Group - Chuck Dowling, Orlando?-

== Growing pains ==
Following an unexpected move out of state for Glenda Ivey, Vicki M. Taylor stepped into the president's role in 2002. Regional Director Doug Dillon became vice-president. FWA's first official election for the positions of president, vice-president, secretary, and treasurer as chosen by the membership took place in 2003. Vicki M. Taylor voluntarily stepped down and Curie Nova became FWA's first elected president. As FWA became larger, the earlier informal structure became a hindrance to the business of the organization. The president's role encompassed a wide breadth of responsibilities and a succession of presidents found the time requirement too much to bear.

In 2004, Vice-President Dan Griffith took over the position from Caryn Suarez and appointed new board member Chrissy Jackson as his vice-president. Both had strong business backgrounds. Anticipating their election by membership at the 2004 conference for 2005, they strategized Griffith's plan to shift FWA's operations into a stable, business model that would carry it forward into the future and tapped Shara Smock as Secretary and Lisa Coleman for Treasurer. But controversy marred the elections after former president Caryn Suarez arranged the showing of a special film at the 2004 RPLA banquet, held during the conference. The film's racial and religious content offended some members. In the fallout Suarez swung her support from acting president Dan Griffith to Port St. Lucie Group Leader Acashya Dolfin. Only 165 of 2004's 450 FWA members were in attendance at the conference and 40 members chose to vote. Dolphin became president, with Jackson as vice-president.

Disagreements led to Jackson's resignation. Robert Mykle became vice-president. Soon, Dolfin also resigned and Mykle became president, with the knowledge that his international business commitments would not allow him to serve out the full term. The board of directors asked Dan Griffith if he were still willing to serve. Mykle named Griffith as his vice-president and then resigned, allowing Griffith to take over the role of president. Griffith appointed Jackson as vice-president and Smock and Coleman returned as secretary and treasurer. The previously conceived Officers and business plan now in place, this group stabilized FWA's early structure and allowed its continued growth.

== New era ==
As membership grew, FWA transitioned into the modern age. The "Palm Groups" became "Writers Groups", which diversified into two types, those that invite speakers in and hold educational seminars on various subjects related to writing and publishing, and those that function primarily as critique groups, with writers submitting work on which they receive feedback and evaluation from the group's members. Some of the groups allow unlimited local members, others form sub-groups of limited numbers. Regional Directors continue to encourage the creed of 'Writers Helping Writers' by encouraging groups to meet the needs of writers in their locations, whether that means forming new groups or holding mini-conferences or bringing in speakers. "Florida Palm Magazine", a twenty-page mailer, became a 'slick' publication called "The Florida Writer", which then morphed into bi-monthly PDF downloads by email to all members, supplemented by a briefer E-newsletter. The website grew up and a blog was added, soon followed by formation of the FWA Network, a members-only online forum. The State conference committee is refreshed with new turnover every couple of years and new faculty applications are encouraged. The RPLA committee, which has seen a jump in entries every year since inception, re-evaluates the competition rules and anonymous judges every year and modifies rules and procedures as needed. A Youth RPLA was established to complement a program for middle and high schoolers called FWA Youth (FWAY). FWAY offers young writers a one-day state conference, local youth groups, and an online critique group. The broadcasting of webinars is FWA's newest outreach project.

== Florida Writers Conference ==
The first Florida Writers Conference was held in mid-October, 2002 at the Orlando Hilton Inn. The Regional Directors promoted the conference and recruited writers for panels and break out sessions. President Glenda Ivey convinced John Boles, a writer and television producer/director to appear as the keynote speaker. She and Doug Dillion also talked Robert Peck, a YA novelist, into presenting a workshop. 179 of FWA's 182 members in October 2002 attended, along with spouses and companions. From 2002 to 2015, all presenters, speakers, and panelists were unpaid volunteers. The conference does sometimes arrange travel and cover lodging fees.

== Successive years ==
2003 saw the formation of a Conference Committee to take the brunt of promotion and recruitment of faculty off the Regional Directors. Although a few members were asked to run workshops, a decision was made to recruit professionals in the form of published writers, agents, editors, and publishers. The keynote speaker was novelist Tim Dorsey, and Daisy Maryles, executive editor of Publishers Weekly served as closing speaker. Agents Linda Mead and Lori Perkins headed a panel on approaching agents and the acquisitions editor of Writer's Digest Books, Jane Friedman, presented a workshop on writing non-fiction book proposals. That crucial 2003 decision has resonated through to 2015. All faculty is invited to present or selected after a vigorous application and approval process. All conference faculty are unpaid volunteers. FWA does sometimes pay travel and lodging fees for out-of area presenters. The current four-day conference format offers panels, workshops, break-out sessions, meals with genre groups, pitch sessions with agents, editors, and publishers, critiques and pitch practice, signings, networking, a store, the Royal Palm Literary Awards banquet, and a parallel young writers track. Well known writers are invited to give the keynote address.

== Royal Palm Literary Awards competition ==
The Royal Palm Literary Awards (RPLA) competition was introduced in 2002 and fifty members were awarded at the RPLA ceremony. Language of Souls, co-authored by K.T. Frankovitch, Ruth Solomon, and David Taub, was named "Best Book of the Year".

The RPLA is an all-volunteer effort which rewards work in multiple categories and genres and including both published and unpublished works. Multiple anonymous judges use rubrics to score and provide feedback on each entry. If a set score is reached, that entry becomes a semi-finalist. Semi-finalist entries move on to a final judge. If the score from that final judge reaches a second set point, the entry becomes a Finalist and is eligible to win an award. The top three scores in each category are awarded as First, Second, and Third place for that category. Since entries must score a set number of points in order to be eligible for an award, each year, there are RPLA categories in which no entry or limited entries are awarded. The RPLA Committee, re-evaluates the competition rules and anonymous judges every year and modifies rules and procedures as needed. Since 2015, all entrants are required to hold an FWA membership, but that has not always been the case.

== Royal Palm Literary Award Winners ==
The winners of Royal Palm Literary Awards (RPLA) are announced and celebrated at a banquet during the annual conference, which was rebranded as Florida WritersCon in 2022. A historical list of winners is maintained on the association's website.
