= Teach-back method =

Communication method used by healthcare providers

The teach-back method, also referred to as "show-me" method, is a communication confirmation method used by healthcare providers to confirm whether a patient (or care takers) understands what is being explained to them. If a patient understands, they are able to "teach-back" the information accurately. This is a communication method intended to improve health literacy.

There can be a significant gap in the perception of how much a patient needs information, or how effective a provider's communication is. This can be due to various reasons such as a patient not understanding medical terminology, not feeling comfortable asking questions or even cognitive impairment. Not only does the teach-back method help providers understand the patient's needs in understanding their care, it also allows providers to evaluate their communication skills. Case studies led by the National Quality Forum on the informed consent processes of various hospitals found that those that effectively used the teach-back method benefited in areas of quality, patient safety, risk management and cost/efficiency.

== The method ==
The National Quality Forum describes the practice as follows:
Who should use the method→ Any healthcare providers. E.g. physicians, nurses, healthcare professionals
What should patients teach-back→Information about their diagnosis, treatment plan, medications, risks and benefit of treatment, etc.
When to ask for teach-back→ Early in the care process
Why is it important→Many patients have difficulty understanding medical information.
How→When asked to teach-back, patients should be able to clearly describe or explain the information provided to them.

Depending on the patient's successful or unsuccessful teach-back, the provider will clarify or modify the information and reassess the teach-back to confirm the patient's comprehension and understanding.

== Knowledge retention ==
The cycle of reassessing and teaching back to confirm comprehension has been found to improve knowledge retention and lower readmission rates in heart failure patients.

Beyond healthcare literacy, the teach-back method can be utilized in academic and professional settings as well. Teachers often create feedback loops in which the instructor asks the student to share what they heard, and promote peer to peer coaching where students explain what they just learned to other students. Retention is also most positively impacted in participatory learning environments, when students participate in group discussions, practice by doing, and teaching others.
