= Laplace functional =

In probability theory, a Laplace functional refers to one of two possible mathematical functions of functions or, more precisely, functionals that serve as mathematical tools for studying either point processes or concentration of measure properties of metric spaces. One type of Laplace functional, also known as a characteristic functional (Note: Kingman calls it a "characteristic functional" but Daley and Vere-Jones and others call it a "Laplace functional", reserving the term "characteristic functional" for when $\theta$ is imaginary.) is defined in relation to a point process, which can be interpreted as random counting measures, and has applications in characterizing and deriving results on point processes. Its definition is analogous to a characteristic function for a random variable.

The other Laplace functional is for probability spaces equipped with metrics and is used to study the concentration of measure properties of the space.

== Definition for point processes ==
For a general point process $\textstyle N$ defined on $\textstyle \textbf{R}^d$, the Laplace functional is defined as:

$$L_{{N}}(f)=E[e^{-\int_{\textbf{R}^d} f(x){N}(dx)}],$$

where $\textstyle f$ is any measurable non-negative function on $\textstyle \textbf{R}^d$ and

$$\int_{\textbf{R}^d} f(x){N}(dx)=\sum\limits_{x_i\in N} f(x_i).$$

where the notation $N(dx)$ interprets the point process as a random counting measure; see Point process notation.

=== Applications ===
The Laplace functional characterizes a point process, and if it is known for a point process, it can be used to prove various results.

== Definition for probability measures ==
For some metric probability space (X, d, μ), where (X, d) is a metric space and μ is a probability measure on the Borel sets of (X, d), the Laplace functional:

$$E_{(X, d, \mu)}(\lambda) := \sup \left\{ \left. \int_{X} e^{\lambda f(x)} \, \mathrm{d} \mu(x) \right| f \colon X \to \mathbb{R} \text{ is bounded, 1-Lipschitz and has } \int_{X} f(x) \, \mathrm{d} \mu(x) = 0 \right\}.$$

The Laplace functional maps from the positive real line to the positive (extended) real line, or in mathematical notation:

$$E_{(X, d, \mu)} \colon [0, +\infty) \to [0, +\infty]$$

=== Applications ===
The Laplace functional of (X, d, μ) can be used to bound the concentration function of (X, d, μ), which is defined for r > 0 by

$$\alpha_{(X, d, \mu)}(r) := \sup \{ 1 - \mu(A_{r}) \mid A \subseteq X \text{ and } \mu(A) \geq \tfrac{1}{2} \},$$

where

$$A_{r} := \{ x \in X \mid d(x, A) \leq r \}.$$

The Laplace functional of (X, d, μ) then gives leads to the upper bound:

$$\alpha_{(X, d, \mu)}(r) \leq \inf_{\lambda \geq 0} e^{- \lambda r / 2} E_{(X, d, \mu)}(\lambda).$$
