= Factorial moment measure =

In probability and statistics, a factorial moment measure is a mathematical quantity, function or, more precisely, measure that is defined in relation to mathematical objects known as point processes, which are types of stochastic processes often used as mathematical models of physical phenomena representable as randomly positioned points in time, space or both. Moment measures generalize the idea of factorial moments, which are useful for studying non-negative integer-valued random variables.

The first factorial moment measure of a point process coincides with its first moment measure or intensity measure, which gives the expected or average number of points of the point process located in some region of space. In general, if the number of points in some region is considered as a random variable, then the moment factorial measure of this region is the factorial moment of this random variable. Factorial moment measures completely characterize a wide class of point processes, which means they can be used to uniquely identify a point process.

If a factorial moment measure is absolutely continuous, then with respect to the Lebesgue measure it is said to have a density (which is a generalized form of a derivative), and this density is known by a number of names such as factorial moment density and product density, as well as coincidence density, joint intensity , correlation function or multivariate frequency spectrum The first and second factorial moment densities of a point process are used in the definition of the pair correlation function, which gives a way to statistically quantify the strength of interaction or correlation between points of a point process.

Factorial moment measures serve as useful tools in the study of point processes as well as the related fields of stochastic geometry and spatial statistics, which are applied in various scientific and engineering disciplines such as biology, geology, physics, and telecommunications.

== Point process notation ==
Point processes are mathematical objects that are defined on some underlying mathematical space. Since these processes are often used to represent collections of points randomly scattered in space, time or both, the underlying space is usually d-dimensional Euclidean space denoted here by R^{d}, but they can be defined on more abstract mathematical spaces.

Point processes have a number of interpretations, which is reflected by the various types of point process notation. For example, if a point $\textstyle x$ belongs to or is a member of a point process, denoted by N, then this can be written as:

$$\textstyle x\in {N},$$

and represents the point process being interpreted as a random set. Alternatively, the number of points of N located in some Borel set B is often written as:

$$\textstyle {N}(B),$$

which reflects a random measure interpretation for point processes. These two notations are often used in parallel or interchangeably.

== Definitions ==
=== n-th factorial power of a point process ===
For some positive integer $\textstyle n=1,2,\ldots$, the $\textstyle n$-th factorial power of a point process $\textstyle {N}$ on $\textstyle \textbf{R}^d$ is defined as:

$${N}^{(n)}(B_1\times\cdots\times B_n)= \sum_{(x_1\neq\dots\neq x_n)\in {N} } \prod_{i=1}^n \mathbf{1}_{B_i}(x_i)$$

where $\textstyle B_1,...,B_n$ is a collection of not necessarily disjoint Borel sets in $\textstyle \textbf{R}^d$, which form an $\textstyle n$-fold Cartesian product of sets denoted by:

$$B_1\times\cdots\times B_n.$$

The symbol $\textstyle \mathbf{1}$ denotes an indicator function such that $\textstyle \mathbf{1}_{B_1}$ is a Dirac measure for the set $\textstyle B_n$. The summation in the above expression is performed over all $\textstyle n$-tuples of distinct points, including permutations, which can be contrasted with the definition of the n-th power of a point process. The symbol $\textstyle \Pi$ denotes multiplication while the existence of various point process notation means that the n-th factorial power of a point process is sometimes defined using other notation.

=== n-th factorial moment measure ===
The n-th factorial moment measure or n-th order factorial moment measure is defined as:

$$M^{(n)}(B_1\times\cdots\times B_n)=E [{N}^{(n)}(B_1\times\cdots\times B_n)],$$

where the E denotes the expectation (operator) of the point process N. In other words, the n-th factorial moment measure is the expectation of the n-th factorial power of some point process.

The n-th factorial moment measure of a point process N is equivalently defined by:

$$\int_{\textbf{R}^{n d}}f(x_1,\ldots,x_n)  M^{(n)}(dx_1,\ldots,dx_n)=E \left[ \sum_{(x_1\neq\cdots\neq x_n)\in {N} } f(x_1,\ldots,x_n)   \right],$$

where $f$ is any non-negative measurable function on $\textbf{R}^{n d}$, and the above summation is performed over all $n$ tuples of distinct points, including permutations. Consequently, the factorial moment measure is defined such that there are no points repeating in the product set, as opposed to the moment measure.

=== First factorial moment measure ===
The first factorial moment measure $\textstyle M^1$ coincides with the first moment measure:

$$M^{(1)}(B)=M^1(B)=E [{N}(B)],$$

where $\textstyle M^1$ is known, among other terms, as the intensity measure or mean measure, and is interpreted as the expected number of points of $\textstyle {N}$ found or located in the set $\textstyle B$

=== Second factorial moment measure ===
The second factorial moment measure for two Borel sets $\textstyle A$ and $\textstyle B$ is:

$$M^{(2)}(A\times B)=M^2(A\times B)-M^1(A\cap B).$$

== Name explanation ==
For some Borel set $\textstyle B$, the namesake of this measure is revealed when the $\textstyle n\,$th factorial moment measure reduces to:

$$M^{(n)}(B\times\cdots\times B)=E [{N}(B)({N}(B)-1)\cdots ({N}(B)-n+1)],$$

which is the $\textstyle n\,$-th factorial moment of the random variable $\textstyle {N}(B)$.

== Factorial moment density ==
If a factorial moment measure is absolutely continuous, then it has a density (or more precisely, a Radon–Nikodym derivative or density) with respect to the Lebesgue measure and this density is known as the factorial moment density or product density, joint intensity, correlation function, or multivariate frequency spectrum. Denoting the $\textstyle n$-th factorial moment density by $\textstyle \mu^{(n)}(x_1,\ldots,x_n)$, it is defined in respect to the equation:

$$M^{(n)}(B_1\times\ldots\times B_n)=\int_{B_1}\cdots\int_{B_n}\mu^{(n)}(x_1,\ldots,x_n) dx_1\cdots dx_n.$$

Furthermore, this means the following expression

$$E \left[ \sum_{(x_1\neq\cdots\neq x_n)\in {N} } f(x_1,\ldots,x_n) \right]= \int_{\textbf{R}^{n d}} f(x_1,\ldots,x_n)  \mu^{(n)}(x_1,\ldots,x_n) dx_1\cdots dx_n,$$

where $\textstyle f$ is any non-negative bounded measurable function defined on $\textstyle \textbf{R}^{ n}$.

== Pair correlation function ==
In spatial statistics and stochastic geometry, to measure the statistical correlation relationship between points of a point process, the pair correlation function of a point process ${N}$ is defined as:

$$\rho(x_1,x_2)=\frac{\mu^{(2)}(x_1,x_2)}{\mu^{(1)}(x_1) \mu^{(1)}(x_2) },$$

where the points $x_1,x_2\in R^d$. In general, $\rho(x_1,x_2)\geq 0$ whereas $\rho(x_1,x_2)=1$ corresponds to no correlation (between points) in the typical statistical sense.

== Examples ==
=== Poisson point process ===
For a general Poisson point process with intensity measure $\textstyle \Lambda$ the $\textstyle n$-th factorial moment measure is given by the expression:

$$M^{(n)}(B_1\times\cdots\times B_n)=\prod_{i=1}^n[\Lambda(B_i)],$$

where $\textstyle \Lambda$ is the intensity measure or first moment measure of $\textstyle {N}$, which for some Borel set $\textstyle B$ is given by:

$$\Lambda(B)=M^1(B)=E[{N}(B)].$$

For a homogeneous Poisson point process the $\textstyle n$-th factorial moment measure is simply:

$$M^{(n)}(B_1\times\cdots\times B_n)=\lambda^n \prod_{i=1}^n |B_i|,$$

where $\textstyle |B_i|$ is the length, area, or volume (or more generally, the Lebesgue measure) of $\textstyle B_i$. Furthermore, the $\textstyle n$-th factorial moment density is:

$$\mu^{(n)}(x_1,\ldots,x_n)=\lambda^n.$$

The pair-correlation function of the homogeneous Poisson point process is simply

$$\rho(x_1,x_2)=1,$$

which reflects the lack of interaction between points of this point process.

== Factorial moment expansion ==
The expectations of general functionals of simple point processes, provided some certain mathematical conditions, have (possibly infinite) expansions or series consisting of the corresponding factorial moment measures. In comparison to the Taylor series, which consists of a series of derivatives of some function, the nth factorial moment measure plays the roll as that of the n th derivative the Taylor series. In other words, given a general functional f of some simple point process, then this Taylor-like theorem for non-Poisson point processes means an expansion exists for the expectation of the function E, provided some mathematical condition is satisfied, which ensures convergence of the expansion.

== See also ==
- Factorial moment
- Moment
- Moment measure
