= Healthcare Financial Management Association =

The Healthcare Financial Management Association is a professional membership organization that helps healthcare finance management executives and professionals navigate the complexities of the healthcare industry. It is based in Downers Grove, DuPage County, Illinois. Founded on September 30, 1946, the organization serves more than 150,000+ members, which include chief financial officers, controllers, and accountants.

== Mission ==
The Healthcare Financial Management Association builds and supports coalitions with other healthcare associations and industry groups to achieve consensus on solutions for the challenges the U.S. healthcare system faces today. Working with a broad cross-section of stakeholders, it identifies gaps throughout the healthcare delivery system and bridges them through the establishment and sharing of knowledge and best practices.

== History ==
The Healthcare Financial Management Association was founded as the American Association for Hospital Accountants by 16 organizing committee members following an organizing meeting held at Indiana University on June 17, 1945. Its early goals were to create more cooperation between hospital accountants and hospital organizations, and to provide hospital accountants a space to share ideas and experiences.

The nonprofit organization changed its name in 1968 to the Hospital Financial Management Association and in 1982 to its current name, to better reflect changes in the industry. It changed its membership model in 2019 to better serve the needs of healthcare finance professionals.

In 1991, Robert M. Shelton, FHFMA, CAE, wrote a history of HFMA, which HFMA published to honor its 45th anniversary. That history, From Acorn to Oak, captured the energy and vision of HFMA's founders, as well as its growth from, as Shelton stated, "a small company of hospital accountants" to a leader in the complex and crucial field of healthcare finance. To celebrate HFMA's 60th anniversary, HFMA has released From Acorn to Oak and Beyond, a history of HFMA covering 1991-2006.

== Awards ==
The organization was awarded the Innovation Award by the .orgCommunity in 2019. The Innovation Award celebrates outstanding innovation and the success of those taking their association or organization to the next level.

Through a submission by its creative agency, the Healthcare Financial Management Association's website received a W3 Silver Award from the Academy of Interactive and Visual Arts in 2019. The W3 Awards honors superior creativity on the web and recognizes the individuals behind award winning web sites, web advertising and web video.

The association's flagship publication, hfm magazine, was honored in 2021 by ASBPE, the American Society of Business Press Editors.

In 2021, the association was honored with five EXCEL Awards from the Association Media & Publishing (AM&P) Network for its podcast, magazine redesign, design excellence, and general excellence.

== Publications ==
The Healthcare Financial Management Association publishes hfm magazine providing industry news, strategies and insights for healthcare finance and revenue cycle professionals.
