= Factorial moment =

Expectation or average of the falling factorial of a random variable

In probability theory, the factorial moment is a mathematical quantity defined as the expectation or average of the falling factorial of a random variable. Factorial moments are useful for studying non-negative integer-valued random variables, and arise in the use of probability-generating functions to derive the moments of discrete random variables.

Factorial moments serve as analytic tools in the mathematical field of combinatorics, which is the study of discrete mathematical structures.

== Definition ==
For a natural number r, the r-th factorial moment of a probability distribution on the real or complex numbers, or, in other words, a random variable X with that probability distribution, is

$$\operatorname{E}\bigl[(X)_r\bigr] = \operatorname{E}\bigl[ X(X-1)(X-2)\cdots(X-r+1)\bigr],$$

where the E is the expectation (operator) and

$$(x)_r := \underbrace{x(x-1)(x-2)\cdots(x-r+1)}_{r \text{ factors}} \equiv \frac{x!}{(x-r)!}$$

is the falling factorial, which gives rise to the name, although the notation (x)_{r} varies depending on the mathematical field. (Note: The Pochhammer symbol (x)_{r} is used especially in the theory of special functions, to denote the falling factorial x(x - 1)(x - 2) ... (x - r + 1);. whereas the present notation is used more often in combinatorics.) Of course, the definition requires that the expectation is meaningful, which is the case if (X)_{r} ≥ 0 or E[|(X)_{r}|] < ∞.

If X is the number of successes in n trials, and p_{r} is the probability that any r of the n trials are all successes, then

$$\operatorname{E}\bigl[(X)_r\bigr] = n(n-1)(n-2)\cdots(n-r+1)p_r$$

== Examples ==
=== Poisson distribution ===
If a random variable X has a Poisson distribution with parameter λ, then the factorial moments of X are

$$\operatorname{E}\bigl[(X)_r\bigr] =\lambda^r,$$

which are simple in form compared to its moments, which involve Stirling numbers of the second kind.

=== Binomial distribution ===
If a random variable X has a binomial distribution with success probability p ∈ [0,1] and number of trials n, then the factorial moments of X are

$$\operatorname{E}\bigl[(X)_r\bigr] = \binom{n}{r} p^r r! = (n)_r p^r,$$

where by convention, $\textstyle{\binom{n}{r}}$ and $(n)_r$ are understood to be zero if r > n.

=== Hypergeometric distribution ===
If a random variable X has a hypergeometric distribution with population size N, number of success states K ∈ {0,...,N} in the population, and draws n ∈ {0,...,N}, then the factorial moments of X are

$$\operatorname{E}\bigl[(X)_r\bigr] = \frac{\binom{K}{r}\binom{n}{r}r!}{\binom{N}{r}} = \frac{(K)_r (n)_r}{(N)_r}.$$

=== Beta-binomial distribution ===
If a random variable X has a beta-binomial distribution with parameters α > 0, β > 0, and number of trials n, then the factorial moments of X are

$$\operatorname{E}\bigl[(X)_r\bigr] = \binom{n}{r}\frac{B(\alpha+r,\beta)r!}{B(\alpha,\beta)} =
(n)_r \frac{B(\alpha+r,\beta)}{B(\alpha,\beta)}$$

== Calculation of moments ==
The rth raw moment of a random variable X can be expressed in terms of its factorial moments by the formula

$$\operatorname{E}[X^r] = \sum_{j=1}^r \left\{ {r \atop j} \right\} \operatorname{E}[(X)_j],$$

where the curly braces denote Stirling numbers of the second kind.

== See also ==
- Factorial moment measure
- Moment (mathematics)
- Cumulant
- Factorial moment generating function
