= Asian Health Literacy Association =

The Asian Health Literacy Association (AHLA; Chinese: 亞洲健康識能學會) is a Taiwanese non-governmental organisation.

The AHLA was founded in 2013 by Shih Yao-tang (石曜堂), a former deputy minister of the Ministry of Health and Welfare, and Chang Wu-hsiu (張武修), who had served in the Control Yuan. The 11th conference was held in Taichung in 2025.

== International conferences ==
=== 1st international conference ===
The first International Conference on Health Literacy and Better Healthcare: EU and Asia was held in 2013 in Taipei, Taiwan.

This event was organized by the Asian Health Literacy Society with support from Taiwan’s National Science Council and Ministry of Health and Welfare, the Taipei City Government Department of Health, the Kaohsiung City and Taitung County Governments, the European Economic and Trade Office, the Ministry of Foreign Affairs and MJGroup.

=== 2nd international conference ===
The 2nd International Conference on Health Literacy and Health Promotion to be held from October 6 to 8 October 2014 in Taipei, Taiwan.
