= Occupational safety and health literacy =

Skill in understanding how to reduce risk to health and safety

Occupational Safety and Health (OSH) literacy is the degree to which individuals have the functional capacity to identify, process and use occupational safety and health (OSH) information, services and skills needed to protect people, property and the planet.

== Overview ==
OSH is the acronym for occupational safety and health. It is sometimes also referred to simply as health and safety (H&S), occupational health and safety (OHS) and workplace safety and health (WSH). In recent years the term has expanded to include environmental and quality assurance concepts. OSH is also referred to as occupational safety and health and environment (OSHE), safety, health and environment (SHE), environment, health and safety (EHS), Safety Health Environment and Quality (SHEQ), and by several other terms. However, OSH is the most established term and is used by many major national and international bodies working in the field of workplace safety and health such as OSHA and NIOSH (US), EU-OSHA (EU), ASEAN-OSHNET (Asia), KOSHA (South Korea) and IOSH (international). The United Nations (UN), Occupational Safety and Health | UN Global Compact, International Labour Organization (ILO) Occupational safety and health and World Health Organization (WHO), also specifically use the term OSH when relating to workplace safety and health issues. The term is specifically used in the UN Sustainable Development Goals (SDGs) 2030 under SDG 8 (Decent Work and Economic Growth) and is also closely tied to SDG 3 (Good Health and Well-Being).

In the global Information Age, people use a system involving various shapes, colours, symbols, signals and specialized terminology to communicate information to prevent accidents. This communication system has been standardized through the work of international organizations and national standards bodies, including the International Organization for Standardization (ISO), the International Electrotechnical Commission (IEC), the United Nations' Globally Harmonized System of Classification and Labelling of Chemicals (GHS), the Vienna Convention on Road Signs and Signals, the United States' Manual on Uniform Traffic Control Devices (MUTCD), the American National Standards Institute (ANSI), and other international frameworks. It is a common misconception that these safety and health signs are applicable only to occupational settings.

As with other "literacies", there are basic competencies that a person also needs to be classified as "literate" in that field. With OSH literacy these are knowledge, skills, behaviour and communication. Levels can be mapped to competency matrices from entry level to advanced.

== Examples ==
Examples of OSH literacy can be found at home on everyday household products (cleaning chemicals, cosmetics, electrical appliances, food packaging, fuels, paints and pesticides), in public places (airports, shopping malls, sports and concert arenas, public roads, schools), and at work. ISO Standard 7010:2019 prescribes safety signs for accident prevention, fire protection, health hazard information and emergency evacuation. It is applicable to all locations where safety issues related to people need to be addressed. Safety signs, symbols, signals and terminology have become ubiquitous in daily life, yet most people have never been taught how to find, identify, evaluate or apply this essential information.

== Effects of lack of OSH literacy and high-risk groups ==
The International Labour Organization (ILO) estimates that nearly 3 million people around the world die each year from work-related accidents or diseases; this corresponds to over 7,500 deaths every day. Worldwide, there are around 374 million occupational accidents and 160 million victims of work-related illnesses annually. According to the World Health Organization (WHO), accidents are the leading cause of death and disability for young people aged 10–18 globally. Road traffic accidents, drowning, chemical poisoning, slips, trips and falls, electrocution, fires, burns and scalds are among the most significant causes.

Research shows that lack of safety and health education, poor communication and human factors are major causal elements in a large proportion of recorded accidents. Particularly vulnerable groups include young workers, older workers, migrant workers, persons with disabilities, and people with low literacy or for whom English is a second language.

== In education ==
For many years, international organizations such as ENETOSH, OSHAfrica, EU-OSHA, OSHA, IOSH, the WHO and ILO have been advocating for safety and health to be mainstreamed into education. These institutions highlight the lifelong socio-economic and health benefits that this can bring, and that it can act as a foundation for lifelong learning. It can be taught as a standalone subject or integrated into others. Whole-school approaches are also advocated.

Research indicates that teaching OSH as a literacy increases understanding, engagement and compliance with OSH information and training. Teaching OSH literacy in classrooms also allows those who struggle with comprehension to be identified early, helping to prevent harm and improve safety outcomes.

In June 2023, the International Organization for Standardization released Part One of its Plain Language Standard (ISO 24495-1:2023 – Plain language — Part 1: Governing principles and guidelines), providing cross-sector guidance for clear communication. In June 2022, the International Labour Conference added Safety and Health to its Fundamental Principles and Rights at Work, requiring all ILO member states to promote safe and healthy working environments.
