= American Health Law Association =

Professional organization

The American Health Law Association (AHLA) is a non-profit professional association for attorneys and other professionals in the healthcare field. AHLA has approximately 12,000 members. The AHLA was created on July 1, 1997, through the merger of the two pre-eminent existing membership associations for health lawyers: the National Health Lawyers Association (NHLA) and the American Academy of Healthcare Attorneys (AAHA) combined into a single organization, AHLA. AHLA is headquartered at 1620 Eye Street NW, Washington, D.C. 20006-4010.

== Mission ==
Its mission is "to provide a collegial forum for interaction and information exchange to enable its members to serve their clients more effectively; to produce the highest quality nonpartisan educational programs, products, and services concerning health law issues; and to serve as a public resource on selected healthcare legal issues."

== Formation ==
The roots of AHLA can be traced back to 1967 when the American Hospital Association (AHA) created a membership association for hospital attorneys to encourage communication and education about hospital legal issues—the American Society for Hospital Attorneys.

The Society eventually became the American Academy of Healthcare Attorneys (the "Academy")and grew to a membership of 3,300 attorneys, approximately one-third of whom were in-house counsel at hospitals, health plans, and other entities in American health care; attorneys from private law firms and government agencies constituted the balance of the membership . The Academy sponsored major educational programs and publications, and remained a component of the AHA until it combined with the National Health Lawyers Association in 1997.

The National Health Lawyers Association (NHLA) was formed in 1971 as a nonprofit educational organization whose membership included health attorneys who represented hospitals, physicians, managed care organizations, home health agencies, and long term care facilities. Over time, the NHLA grew to over 8,500 members, producing educational programs and publications, including the Health Law Digest.

In 1996, leaders of the Academy and NHLA began discussions about merging the two organizations whose missions had grown together as the healthcare landscape changed over time with vertical integration and common issues. On July 1, 1997, NHLA and the Academy merged, adopting an interim name "NHLA/AAHA." In 1998, its name was changed to the American Health Lawyers Association. On January 16, 2020, the Association changed its name to the American Health Law Association.

== Governance ==
AHLA is governed by a 22-member Board of Directors, which meets twice annually in person and several times virtually. The Board operates through six committees: Education, Executive, Finance, Governance, Membership-IDEA, and Nominating. The organization also draws volunteers from its membership to serve as leaders on Practice Groups, Conference Planning Committees, Special Councils, and Advisory Boards.

== Practice Areas ==
Health law encompasses federal, state, and local laws, rules, regulations and cases that govern the health care industry. AHLA members work across numerous practice areas including: Antitrust, Behavioral Health, Dispute Resolution, Fraud and Abuse, Governance, Government Reimbursement, Health Care Delivery Models, Health Care Finance and Transactions, Health Information, Health Insurance, Health Policy and Administration, Labor and Employment, Life Sciences, Long Term Care, Medical Staff/Credentialing/Peer Review, Patient Care Liability and Litigation, and Tax and Nonprofit law.

== Strategic Planning ==
AHLA operates under a multi-year strategic plan designed to meet the evolving needs of its members and stakeholders. The organization's Strategic Plan, approved in January 2023 and implemented in June 2023, provides guidance for adapting to changes in legal practice and the health law industry.
