= Mental health literacy =

Ability to recognise and understand mental health disorders

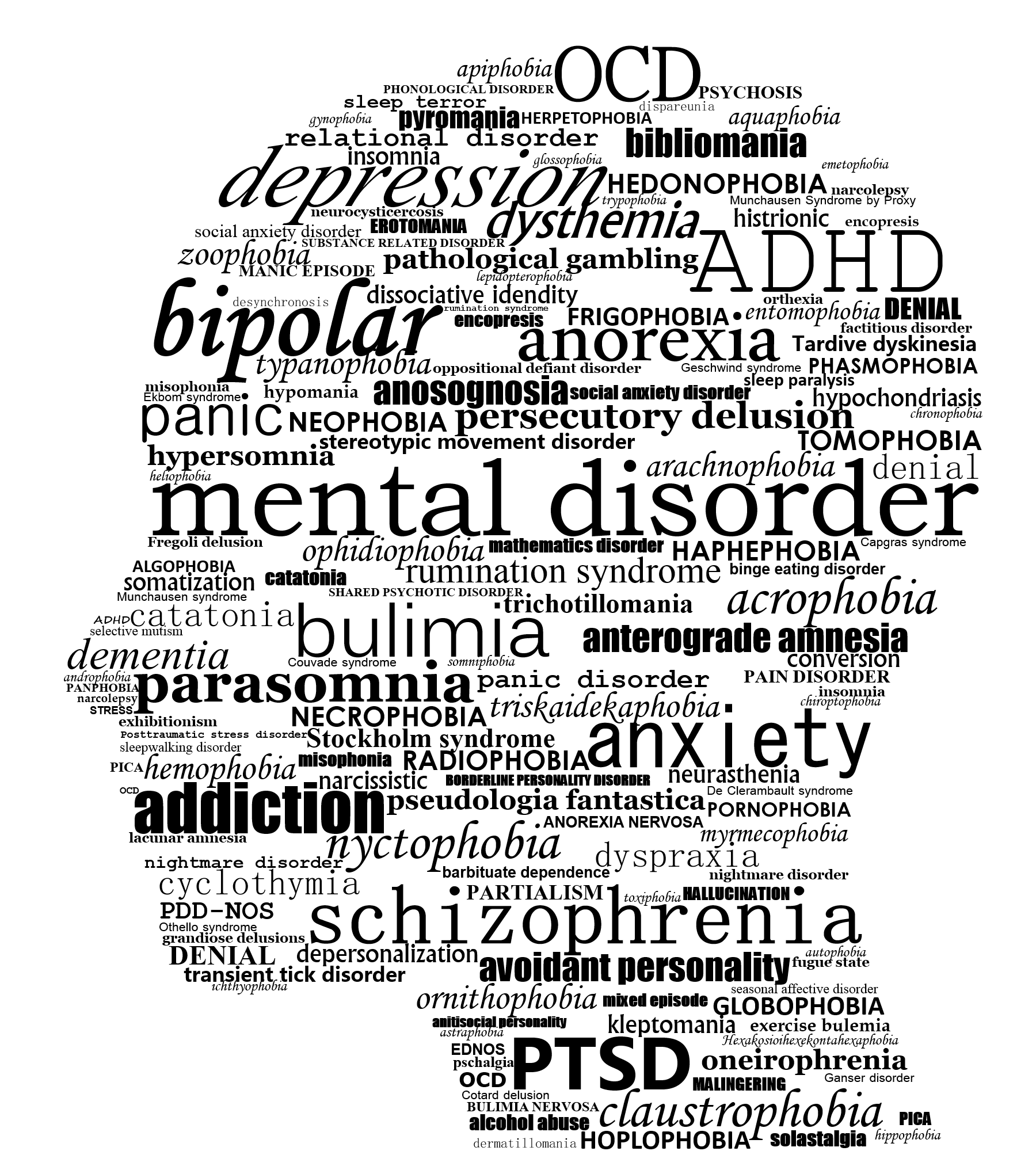
A picture showing the variety of mental health illnesses.

Mental health literacy has been defined as "knowledge and beliefs about mental disorders which aid their recognition, management and prevention. Mental health literacy includes the ability to recognize specific disorders; knowing how to seek mental health information; knowledge of risk factors and causes, of self-treatments, and of professional help available; and attitudes that promote recognition and appropriate help-seeking". The concept of mental health literacy was derived from health literacy, which aims to increase patient knowledge about physical health, illnesses, and treatments.

== Framework ==
Mental health literacy has three major components: recognition, knowledge, and attitudes. A conceptual framework of mental health literacy illustrates the connections between components, and each is conceptualized as an area to target for measurement or intervention. While some researchers have focused on a single component, others have focused on multiple and/or the connection between components. For example, a researcher may focus solely on improving recognition of disorders through an education program, whereas another researcher may focus on integrating all three components into one program.

=== Recognition ===
Recognition can be broken down into symptom or illness recognition. Symptom recognition is the ability to detect beliefs, behaviors, and other physical manifestations of mental illness, without knowing explicitly which disorder they link to. Specific illness recognition is the ability to identify the presentation of a disorder, such as major depressive disorder.

The recognition of difference between knowledge and attitudes is a crucial part of the mental health literacy framework. While some efforts have focused on promoting knowledge, other researchers have argued that changing attitudes by reducing stigma is a more prolific way of creating meaningful change in mental healthcare utilization. Overall, both approaches have benefits for improving outcomes.

==== Public recognition ====
Public knowledge about physical disease and health are often recognized and widely accepted but knowledge about mental health literacy is comparably neglected. Many people cannot recognize mental health disorders or different psychological distress. If mental health literacy doesn't improve, it may continue to neglect mental health care, and feeling denied of self-help and support from community.

=== Knowledge ===
Knowledge is the largest component of mental health literacy, and important topics in mental health include:

- How to get information: the networks and systems individuals use to get information about mental disorders. This may include friends, family, educators, or broader sources, such as entertainment or social media.
- Risk factors: what factors put individuals at greatest risk for specific mental health disorders? Risk factors can be unemployment, low income, lack of education, discrimination, and violence.
- Self-treatment or self-help: what are the best things individuals can do to help themselves recover without consulting with professionals, including the use of self-help books and media? However, many self-treatments are quite ineffective and even harmful due to a lack of knowledge.

=== Attitudes ===
Attitudes are studied in two sub-components: attitudes about mental disorders, or persons with mental disorders, and attitudes about seeking professional help or treatment. Attitudes can vary greatly by individual, and can often be difficult to measure or target with intervention. Nonetheless, a large body of research literature exists on both sub-components, though not always explicitly tied to the mental health literacy.

Recent research recognizes the varying attitudes across mental health professionals towards prognosis, long-term outcomes and likelihood of discrimination as more negative than those of the public. The attitudes of mental health professionals also differ towards interventions, but this variability is usually related to professional orientation.

== Public outlook ==
Surveys of the public have been carried out in a number of countries to investigate mental health literacy. These surveys demonstrate that the recognition of mental disorders is lacking and reveal negative beliefs about some standard psychiatric treatments, particularly medications. On the other hand, psychological, complementary and self-help methods are viewed much more positively. The public tends to prefer self-help and lifestyle interventions, opposed to medical, and psychopharmacological interventions.

Implications surrounding public attitudes towards mental disorders include negative Stereotypes, Prejudice, or Stigma. As a result, this can influence help-seeking behavior or failure to seek treatment. In Canada, a national survey found that young adult males tend to manage their problems individually and are less likely to seek formal help. Media influence plays a huge role in perpetuating negative mindsets towards mental illness, such as prescribing menacing qualities. A recent study highlights how the majority of participants note the media as the primary source of their beliefs about mental illness being associated with violence, and how this attitude is more prevalent towards serious mental illnesses. Fear and perceptions of danger related to mental illness have increased over the past few decades, largely due to serious mental illness such as schizophrenia being associated as potentially violent and harmful to others. These beliefs and attitudes are potential barriers to seeking individual professional help, and being supportive of others.

Additionally, the negative stigma against mental health may impede the ability of some to get help. When a caregiver avoids seeking mental health treatment due to fear of the stigma surrounding the label of a mental illness, it is seen as affiliate stigma. This phenomenon is exacerbated in scenarios where children who present with signs of mental illness have parents who hold negative beliefs about mental illness. Studies found that individuals that have a negative impression of mental health labels might refuse seeking treatment for themselves or their children in order to avoid mental illness label. A study in 2015 found that affiliate stigma decreases a parent's willingness to pursue mental health treatment for their children, which can lead to decreases in overall well-being for children. It is also found that suicide is the third leading cause of death for ages 15 to 19. This same study found that some parents fear that general practitioners will judge them as bad parents if their children are diagnosed with ADHD.

=== Military ===
Along with schizophrenia, PTSD is also a highly stigmatized mental disorder that is often misunderstood, especially among the military community. Studies have found that there are various barriers to treatment that prevent many veterans from seeking treatment for PTSD and other mental disorders such as concerns that others will see them as "crazy", beliefs that treatment is ineffective or is simply not worth it, and beliefs that those with mental health problems cannot be relied upon. These beliefs about mental health and mental health treatment is more prevalent in the military community due to the culture of the military that places a strong emphasis on emotional toughness, self-control and stoicism. Though these values are useful in combat scenarios, they can serve as barriers to seeking treatment and treatment adherence.

== Measures ==
Researchers have measured aspects of mental health literacy in several ways. Popular methodologies include vignette studies and achievement tests. Vignette studies measure mental health literacy by providing a brief, detailed story of an individual (or individuals) with a mental health problem, and ask participants questions to identify what problem the individual is experiencing, and at times, additional questions about how the individual can help themselves.

Achievement tests measure mental health literacy on a continuum, such that higher scores on a test indicate greater overall knowledge or understanding of a concept. Achievement tests can be formatted using multiple-choice, true/false, or other quantitative scales.

=== Scales ===
Various scales have been created to measure the various components of mental health literacy, though not all are validated. Mental health literacy has been measured across several populations, varying in age range, culture, and profession. Most studies have focused on adult and young adult populations, though improving literacy in children has been a focus of prevention efforts.

Parental label avoidance can be measured by the Self-Stigma of Seeking Help Scale (SSOSH).

Family empowerment is measured by the Family Empowerment Scale (FES).

The three levels of development

- Measure development
  - Seven attributes of MHL were developed using clinical psychology
  - Clinical results reveal insufficient level of knowledge in the field to enable differentiation of risk factors for mental illness and the causes.
- Item testing
  - Items are generated of the attributes by the research team and clinical panel
- psychometrics and methodology quality
  - Results for the ability to recognize mental disorders

== Limitations ==
A statue of a man deep in thought.

Low literacy within a population is a relevant concern, since at the most basic level, mental health literacy is linked to general literacy. Without this foundation, the beneficial effects of mental health literacy are challenging for those who face difficulties with reading and writing. Increased measures to increase literacy rates must be employed to empower and encourage the self-help components of mental health literacy.

Populations can be diverse, which means barriers, such as cultural and social contexts, must be addressed. Within and across cultures, social, economic and political factors profoundly influence mental health. There are numerous environmental and socioeconomic determinants of mental health and mental illness, just as there are for physical health and physical illness. Social determinants of physical health including poverty, education and social support also serve as influencers. In order to encompass mental health literacy and diverse perspectives, further research in these areas are needed.

Recognizing uncommon mental disorders is another hurdle that can disrupt mental health literacy within the public. Recent research shows that most studies are limited to identifying depression, generalized anxiety, and schizophrenia. In a recent Canadian study, most participants demonstrated good mental health literacy in regards to most mental health disorders, but a poor understanding of panic disorder. An increased awareness surrounding underrepresented or more uncommon mental disorders is needed to widen public knowledge.

A concluding limitation is the lack of research on child mental health literacy, as the majority of studies focus on adults and adolescents. If caregivers are not educated on recognizing and supporting mental disorders, this could create confusion and result in delayed treatment or wrongful prognosis for dependents. A child mental health literacy (CMHL) initiative could be implemented to target all adults in the general population, as well as parents, teachers, health professionals and/or children themselves.

== Mental Health At Home ==
Children often must rely on their families in order to access mental health services leading to parents receiving an increasing amount of attention from mental health professionals in order to educate them on mental health. The status of family empowerment (FE) is composed of two dimensions: (a) levels of empowerment (family, knowledge, system and community) and (b) the manor that empowerment is expressed (such as attitudes, knowledge and behaviors). Studies have shown that FE is positively associated with healthy child functioning. FE also deals with an individual's belief in their ability to execute behaviors necessary to produce specific performance attainments, also called self-efficacy, specifically regarding attaining knowledge of mental health. A study conducted in 2022 found that increased parent self-efficacy regarding mental health is positively correlated with child well-being outcomes.

=== Public Education System on Mental Health Literacy ===
Schools can teach mental health in core classes or include it in required health education. These mental health lessons can teach practice skills and have an environment for students to share their mental health journeys. According to CDC, teaching mental health can reduce stigma and improve student knowledge and attitude towards mental health, as well as ask for support. They can do this by teaching that mental health is treatable, helping students learn how to reduce and explain their feelings, and supporting students who need help.
