= Abstraction (mathematics) =

Process of extracting the underlying essence of a mathematical concept

Abstraction in mathematics is the process of extracting the underlying structures, patterns or properties of a mathematical concept, removing any dependence on real world objects with which it might originally have been connected, and generalizing it so that it has wider applications or matching among other abstract descriptions of equivalent phenomena. In other words, to be abstract is to remove context and application. Two of the most highly abstract areas of modern mathematics are category theory and model theory.

== Description ==
Many areas of mathematics began with the study of real world problems, before the underlying rules and concepts were identified and defined as abstract structures. For example, geometry has its origins in the calculation of distances and areas in the real world, and algebra started with methods of solving problems in arithmetic.

Abstraction is an ongoing process in mathematics and the historical development of many mathematical topics exhibits a progression from the concrete to the abstract. For example, the first steps in the abstraction of geometry were historically made by the ancient Greeks, with Euclid's Elements being the earliest extant documentation of the axioms of plane geometry—though Proclus tells of an earlier axiomatisation by Hippocrates of Chios. In the 17th century, Descartes introduced Cartesian co-ordinates which allowed the development of analytic geometry. Further steps in abstraction were taken by Lobachevsky, Bolyai, Riemann and Gauss, who generalised the concepts of geometry to develop non-Euclidean geometries. Later in the 19th century, mathematicians generalised geometry even further, developing such areas as geometry in n dimensions, projective geometry, affine geometry and finite geometry. Finally Felix Klein's "Erlangen program" identified the underlying theme of all of these geometries, defining each of them as the study of properties invariant under a given group of symmetries. This level of abstraction revealed connections between geometry and abstract algebra.

In mathematics, abstraction can be advantageous in the following ways:

- It reveals deep connections between different areas of mathematics.
- Known results in one area can suggest conjectures in another related area.
- Techniques and methods from one area can be applied to prove results in other related areas.
- Patterns from one mathematical object can be generalized to other similar objects in the same class.

On the other hand, abstraction can also be disadvantageous in that highly abstract concepts can be difficult to learn. A degree of mathematical maturity and experience may be needed for conceptual assimilation of abstractions.

Bertrand Russell, in The Scientific Outlook (1931), writes that "Ordinary language is totally unsuited for expressing what physics really asserts, since the words of everyday life are not sufficiently abstract. Only mathematics and mathematical logic can say as little as the physicist means to say."

== See also ==
- Abstract detail
- Generalization
- Abstract thinking
- Abstract logic
- Abstract algebraic logic
- Abstract model theory
- Abstract nonsense
- Concept
- Mathematical maturity
