= Idle Hour (disambiguation) =

Idle Hour or variation, may refer to:

== Arts and entertainment ==
- Hours of Idleness (book) 1807 poetry collection by Lord Byron
- Idle Hours (album), a 1962 blues album
- Idle Hours (painting), an 1894 landscape painting

== Places, buildings, structures ==
- Idle Hour Café, Los Angeles, California; a historic bar and restaurant
- Idle Hour, Lexington, Kentucky, USA; a neighborhood
- Idle Hour, Oakdale, Suffolk County, Long Island, New York State, USA; the former Vanderbilt estate
- Idle Hours, Beaumont, Texas, USA; an NRHP-listed country house
- Idle Hour Stock Farm, Lexington, Kentucky, USA; a former thoroughbred horse farm

== See also ==
- Hour (disambiguation)
- Idle (disambiguation)
