= Ídolos =

Ídolos may refer to:

- Ídolos (Brazilian TV series)
- Ídolos (Portuguese TV series)
- Idols (1943 film) (Spanish: Ídolos),

== See also ==
- Idol (disambiguation)
