= Miguel Báez Espuny =

Spanish bullfighter (1930–2022)

Personal information
- Nickname: El Litri
- Nationality: Spanish
- Born: 5 October 1930 Gandia, Valencian Country, Spain
- Died: 18 May 2022 (aged 91) Madrid, Spain
- Resting place: Cementerio de la Soledad, Huelva
- Monuments: Monumento a la Dinastía Litri, Huelva
- Home town: Huelva
- Education: Colegio HH. Maristas Huelva
- Occupation: Bullfighter
- Years active: 1947–1987
- Agent: José Flores "Camará" (apoderado)
- Spouse: Concha Spínola
- Children: Miguel Báez Spínola "El Litri"
- Parents: Miguel Báez Quintero "El Litri" (father); Ángela Espuny Lozar (mother)

Miguel Báez Espuny (5 October 1930 – 18 May 2022), better known as "El Litri", was a Spanish bullfighter, a descendant of one of Huelva's foremost bullfighting dynasties.

His grandfather, his father, and his half-brother were likewise bullfighters, although it was he himself who outshone them all in fame and recognition. His fame became so great that in 1960, he made his own film, entitled Litri and His Shadow (Spanish: El Litri y su sombra), in which he tells the story of the whole saga, with himself as the protagonist and the cornerstone for having been the one to reach the greatest height. Báez's son, Miguel Báez Spínola "El Litri", was also a well-known matador in the 1990s.

== Early life ==
Báez's father, Miguel Báez Quintero "El Litri", a matador who enjoyed a certain level of fame in Huelva, had faith in his son Manuel's future, as his skill with the sword put him among the most promising young bullfighters at that time, but then, on 11 February 1926, Manuel was gored by a bull named Extremeño during a bullfight in Málaga, and died of his wounds in hospital a week later.

By this time, the elder Miguel Báez was a widower, for his first wife had died, and, now crushed by his only son's death, he fell into a deep depression. It was then that he met and got to know one of his late son's young admirers, Ángela Espuny Lozar, who had been born in Tavernes de la Valldigna in the Valencian Community, although she now lived in Gandia. From this union was born Miguel Báez Espuny. While on his deathbed in 1932, the elder Miguel made his wife promise to see to it that their young son would not follow in his forebears' footsteps into the world of bullfighting.

== Early bullfighting success ==
Nevertheless, as he grew, the younger Miguel became an avid bullfighting fan and would soon make it known that he wanted to become a bullfighter. His career in this profession began on 17 August 1947 in Valverde del Camino in the Province of Huelva, where he shared the billing with José Utrera "Costillares" and Juan Barranco Posada, and at which bullfights the bulls were supplied by Gerardo Ortega. He presented himself at the Merced bullring in Huelva, and with resounding success, on 28 March 1948, once again sharing the billing with "Costillares" and Juan Barranco Posada, the latter of whom, who was himself from Huelva, would also be his companion on many bullfighting afternoons. That day, the three of them fought bulls supplied by Gerardo Ortega and Esteban González del Camino.

Such was the passion that Báez's fellow countrymen showed him in the way they received him in the city, in the events organized by the Tertulia Litri, which was headquartered in the city's central San Sebastián neighbourhood, when Pepe Ramos would launch his rockets to celebrate the bullfighter's successes, wherever Báez had been fighting bulls, and in other ways, that the Huelva maestro Félix Trujillo wrote a pasodoble in his honour, the Pasodoble del Litri, with lyrics by Domingo Manfredi and Alejandro Wilke.

By 1950, José Flores "Camará" had become Báez's apoderado (manager, or agent). Flores had been Manolete's apoderado.

When the Huelva municipality Ayamonte's bullring was approaching its centenary, the complex was remodelled and its newly transformed version was inaugurated on 9 July 1950, with "El Litri", Julio Aparicio Martínez and Pepe Gallardo on the bill, then a very popular lineup; bulls were supplied by Fermín Bohórquez Escribano, famous as a rejoneador in his time, as well as for breeding fighting bulls. Installed at the bullring is a glazed tile by the painter Florencio Aguilera that commemorates that corrida. It was placed on 6 May 2010, on the occasion of the ring's sesquicentenary, and attending the ceremony was Báez himself, serving as the Galeonero de Honor.

After three years as a novillero (novice bullfighter who fights yearling bulls), Báez stood out in the 1949 bullfighting season with more than one hundred novilladas (fights), with countless bullfights throughout Spain, but mainly at the bullrings in Huelva, Barcelona, A Coruña, Córdoba, Seville, Jerez de la Frontera, Valencia, Zaragoza, and others. On 18 May 1950, Báez had one of his greatest professional triumphs, coming out through the Great Gate at Las Ventas in Madrid after fighting the yearling bull Alpargatero from Manuel González's ranch.

== Career as a matador ==
Báez took his alternativa on 12 October 1950 with resounding success at the Valencia bullring, cutting four ears and two tails in his fights. Standing as his "godfather" was Joaquín Rodríguez "Cagancho" and as witness, Julio Aparicio Martínez. The bulls belonged to Antonio Urquijo's ranch.

Báez's presentation as a matador came in Seville on 17 April 1951, when he shared billing with Manuel González Cabello and Julio Aparicio, with bulls supplied by Carlos Núñez; "Litri" cut two ears and was borne shoulder-high out through the Prince's Gate (Puerta del Príncipe).

Báez's confirmation came on 17 May 1951; the "godfather" this time was Pepe Luis Vázquez Garcés, and the witness was Antonio Bienvenida; the bulls came from the Bohórquez ranch, and "Litri" cut one ear at this corrida.

On 21 June this same year, Báez had his début in the Charitable Corrida, cutting both ears from each bull. His triumph in Madrid continued at the Police Social Collective Fund bullfights on 28 June, when he cut three ears. In this bullfighting season, Báez fought in 67 corridas, and the next season (1952) in 59.

For the next two years after that, however, Báez shunned the bullring, reappearing in 1955, when he fought in 21 corridas, beginning with the Valencia Fair. Over the next two bullfighting seasons, he fought in 31 and 63 corridas respectively, but on 28 April 1958, Báez was wounded during a bullfight in Seville. Nevertheless, that same season, he fought bulls at the Madrid Fair on 13, 14 and 16 May, cutting ears on all three days. By late 1958, though, he once again withdrew from the bullfighting world, coming back in 1959, but only for four afternoons.

It would not be until 1964 that Báez would once again give himself over to bullfighting, appearing on 9 February 1964 at the Valverde del Camino bullring. This would be the year when he fought in the most corridas: 68. In this season, he did not do any bullfighting in Seville, but he did in Madrid, where he achieved great success on four bullfighting afternoons. In 1965, a heifer broke the left transverse process of Báez's second lumbar vertebra, putting an end to any hope that he would do any bullfighting that year. The next, however (1966), saw him appear in 25 corridas, among them two at the Seville Fair in April, and three at Saint Isidore's Fair in Madrid. In Seville he cut two ears, one on 17 April and the other two days later. In Madrid, he saw success on 18 May and, particularly, on 25 May, which would be his last great triumph at that bullring, cutting both the bull's ears; he had been supplied by the Garzón ranch.

In 1965, before a great crowd, an act of homage was celebrated at Huelva's Plaza de Toros de La Merced at which Báez received the Great Cross of Beneficence (Order of Beneficence) from the then Mayor of Huelva, Manuel López Rebollo, before Fermín Bohórquez Escribano, Julio Aparicio and Diego Puerta. Witnesses to the act were the local and provincial authorities, businessmen from Las Ventas and Seville, and members of the Organizing Committee of the homage.

In 1967, Báez saw his last full bullfighting season, with 35 corridas. He performed again in Madrid and Seville, earning one ear at the Seville bullring in his first bullfight there — and getting wounded in the next.

== Semi-retirement ==
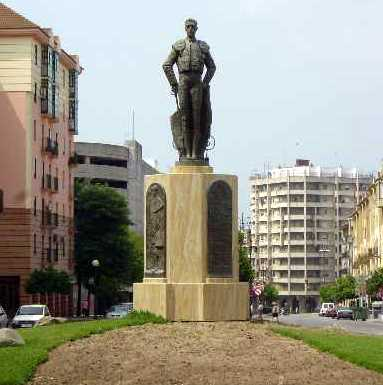
Monument to the "Litri" dynasty of bullfighters in Huelva; the full-body figure on top is a likeness of Miguel Báez Espuny himself.

Thereafter, Báez only fought again on sporadic occasions. For the inauguration of the ill-fated Plaza de toros Monumental de Huelva, he fought on 2 and 3 August 1968, sharing billing with Manuel Benítez "El Cordobés" and Ángel Teruel on the former day, and with Paco Camino and Palomo Linares on the latter. The bulls were supplied by Celestino Cuadri.

On 29 July 1984, Báez dressed in a suit of lights for the revival of Huelva's Plaza de Toros de La Merced, performing at the Columbian Festivals, sharing billing with Curro Romero and Pepe Luis Vázquez Silva. The bulls bore the Jandilla brand.

Báez's last appearance as a bullfighter came on 26 September 1987 on the occasion of his son's alternativa at the Arena of Nîmes (an Ancient Roman arena, nowadays used as a bullring) in France.

== Later life ==
In 1998, the Council of Ministers awarded various personalities from the world of culture, among them Báez, the Gold Medal of Merit in the Fine Arts.

On 19 January 2002, a sculptural group was unveiled in the city of Huelva as a homage to the "Litri" bullfighting dynasty, which began its historic steps with Manuel Báez Aráuz's modest bullfighting work (he was nicknamed Mequi, and lived 1830-1873), followed by his son Miguel Báez Quintero (1869-1932), who was succeeded by his nephew José Rodríguez Báez, "Litri II" (1891-1958), and his son Manuel Báez Fernández, who died in the bullring (1905-1926), and bearing witness to the saga was Miguel Báez Espuny himself, who further passed the family's tradition on to another brave man, the last link in the "Litri" chain, Báez's own son, Miguel Báez Spínola. The monument is sculptor Alberto Germán Franco's work, and can be found at the square that bears the saga's name.

Huelva city council awarded Báez the title of the city's Adoptive Son, conferring this distinction upon him on 21 January 2000. Furthermore, the Government Council of the Regional Government of Andalusia awarded him in 2007 the Medal of Andalusia, and in 2010 he also received the gold medal of the province from the Provincial Deputation of Huelva "as representative of a whole dynasty of bullfighters who have always been ambassadors of the province of Huelva".

Throughout Báez's long life, he received no end of homages and recognition from Huelva's and the surrounding province's bullfighting aficionados, also being named in 2010 Adoptive Son of the municipality of Punta Umbría.

== Religious affiliations ==
Linked as he was since childhood to his city's customs and traditions, Báez belonged to the Hermandad de la Borriquita ("Brotherhood of the Little Jenny-Ass"), in which he was an Elder Brother, the Sacramental Brotherhood of the Passion, the Brotherhood of Our Lady of the Ribbon, and the Brotherhood of Our Lady of Rocío of Huelva (in which he was Hermano Mayor de la Romería, or "Elder Brother of the Romería", in 1969), coming to be included in their governing bodies at certain times. Greatly in the fore throughout his career was Báez's predisposition to collaborate with these bodies as a disinterested party in organizing charitable festivals.

== Death ==
Báez died in Madrid on 18 May 2022 at the age of 91, after a long illness. He was buried at the "family pantheon" at the Cementerio de la Soledad in Huelva. Báez's wife, Concha Spínola, died less than three weeks later, on 6 June 2022, at the age of 71.
