= Idealism (disambiguation) =

Idealism may be:

== In the arts ==
- Idealism (arts)
- Magical idealism in works of Novalis

== In philosophy ==
- Idealism

Idealist approaches in philosophy include:

- Absolute idealism
- Actual idealism
- Alethic idealism
- Analytic idealism
- British idealism
- Canadian idealism
- Conceptual idealism
- Dialectical idealism
- Ethical idealism
- Epistemological idealism
- French idealism
- German idealism
- Italian idealism
- Moral idealism
  - Idealism (ethics)
- Objective idealism
- Personal idealism
- Phenomenalistic idealism
- Platonic idealism
- Pluralistic idealism
- Political idealism
- Practical idealism
- Pragmatic idealism
- Subjective/empirical idealism
- Teleological idealism
- Transcendental idealism

== Other uses ==
- Idealism (album), the debut album by Digitalism
- Idealism (Christian eschatology)
- Idealism in international relations theory
  - Wilsonian idealism
- Idealism (Turkey)
- Idealist (film), a 1976 film
- IdeaList (software), database software for Windows and Macintosh

== See also ==
- Ideal (disambiguation)
- Realism (disambiguation)
