= Idle =

Idle generally refers to idleness, a lack of motion or energy.

Idle or idling, may also refer to:

== Technology ==
- Idle (engine), engine running without load
  - Idle speed
- Idle (CPU), CPU non-utilisation or low-priority mode
  - Synchronous Idle (SYN), the idle command to synchronize terminals
  - System Idle Process
- Idle (programming language), a dialect of Lua
- IDLE, an integrated development environment for the Python programming language
- IMAP IDLE, an IMAP feature where an email server actively notifies a client application when new mail has arrived

== Places ==
- Idle (GNR) railway station, in Idle, West Yorkshire
- Idle (L&BR) railway station, in Idle, West Yorkshire
- Idle, West Yorkshire, UK; a suburb of Bradford, England
  - Idle railway station
- Idle and Thackley, a ward in Bradford Metropolitan District in the county of West Yorkshire, England, UK
  - Idle railway station (Leeds and Bradford Railway)
- River Idle, a river flowing through Nottinghamshire, England

== People ==
- Mrs. Idle (born 1940), a stagename for Australian actress Lyn Ashley
- Christopher Idle (politician) (1771–1819), British politician
- Christopher Idle (hymnwriter) (born 1938), British hymnodist
- Eric Idle (born 1943), a comedian, sketch writer, and actor, member of Monty Python
- Graham Idle (born 1950), British rugby footballer

== Entertainment ==
=== Music ===
- Idle, a 2000 demo album by the band Daylight Dies
- I-dle, a South Korean girl group

=== Video games ===
- IDLE, a group of characters in the 2024 Nintendo Switch game Mario & Luigi: Brothership
- Idle game, another name for an incremental game

== Other uses ==
- Indolent lesions of epithelial origin (IDLE), a classification of cancers

== See also ==
- Adle
- Christopher Idle (disambiguation)
- Ideal (disambiguation)
- Idel (disambiguation)
- Idle Hour (disambiguation)
- Idler (disambiguation)
- Idles (disambiguation)
- Idol (disambiguation)
- Idyl (disambiguation)
