= Ideal =

Ideal may refer to:

== Philosophy ==
- Ideal (ethics), values that one actively pursues as goals
- Platonic ideal, a philosophical idea of trueness of form, associated with Plato

== Mathematics ==
- Ideal (ring theory), special subsets of a ring considered in abstract algebra
- Ideal, special subsets of a semigroup
- Ideal (order theory), special kind of lower sets of an order
- Ideal on a set, a collection of sets regarded as "small" or "negligible"
- Ideal (Lie algebra), a particular subset in a Lie algebra
- Ideal point, a boundary point in hyperbolic geometry
- Ideal triangle, a triangle in hyperbolic geometry whose vertices are ideal points

== Science ==
- Ideal chain, in science, the simplest model describing a polymer
- Ideal gas law, in physics, governing the pressure of an ideal gas
- Ideal transformer, an electrical transformer having zero resistance and perfect magnetic threading
- Ideal final result, in TRIZ methodology, the best possible solution
- Thought experiment, sometimes called an ideal experiment
- Ideal type, a social science term
- Ideal solution, a solution with thermodynamic properties analogous to those of a mixture of ideal gases

== Arts and entertainment ==
- Ideal (group), a late-1990s/2000s American R&B group
- Ideal (German band), an early-1980s German rock group
- Ideal (album), a 1999 album by the R&B group Ideal
- An Ideal, a 2016 album by Li Ronghao
- Ideal (novel), a 1934 novel by Ayn Rand, published in 2015
  - Ideal (play), a 1936 play by Ayn Rand, adapted from the novel, published in 1989
- Ideal (TV series), a British situation comedy
- Ideals (sculpture), a 1992 bronze sculpture by Muriel Castanis

== Business ==
- Ideal Film Company, a British film studio of the silent era
- Ideal Ice Cream, an Indian ice cream company
- Ideal Industries, an American manufacturer of electrical connectors and tools
- Ideal Toy Company, a defunct American toy company
- Ideal TV, a defunct Brazilian television channel
- Ideal (newspaper), a Spanish-language newspaper in Granada
- iDEAL, an online payment method in the Netherlands
- Changhe Ideal, a city car produced by a joint-venture of Changhe and Suzuki

== Places in the United States ==
- Ideal, Georgia, a city
- Ideal, South Dakota, an unincorporated community

== Other uses ==
- Ideal 18, a Canadian sailboat design
- Ideal Mini School, Vancouver, British Columbia, Canada, a public secondary mini school
- IDEAL framework (Idea, Development, Exploration, Assessment, Long-term study), a framework for describing the stages of innovation in surgery
- IDEAL (Interactive Development Environment for an Application Lifecycle), a development language above COBOL for DATACOM/DB

== See also ==
- Idealism (disambiguation)
- Idea
- Idol (disambiguation)
- Idle (disambiguation)
- Idyl (disambiguation)
