= Anthropology from a Pragmatic Point of View =

Book by Prussian philosopher Immanuel Kant

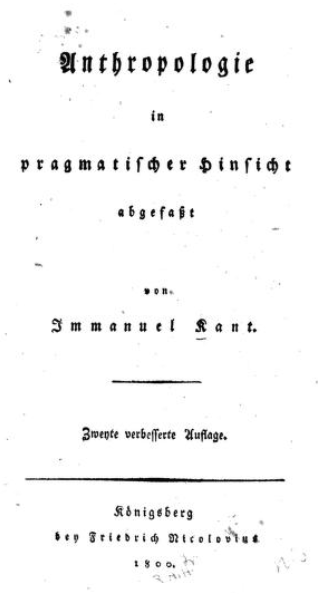
- Title page for Anthropologie in pragmatischer Hinsicht (1800)
- Author: Immanuel Kant
- Language: German
- Subject: Anthropology; Kantianism
- Publication date: 1798
- Publication place: Germany

Anthropology from a Pragmatic Point of View (German: Anthropologie in pragmatischer Hinsicht) is a non-fiction book by German philosopher Immanuel Kant. The work was developed from lecture notes for a number of successful classes taught by Kant from 1772 to 1796 at the Albertus Universität in then Königsberg, Germany. While nominally detailing the nature of anthropology as a field, it additionally discusses a variety of topics in terms of Kantian thought.

In the context of the historical development of philosophical writings, the work has attracted international attention. Scholars Victor L. Dowdell and Hans H. Rudnick, for example, have argued that Anthropology from a Pragmatic Point of View constitutes the best way for layperson readers to begin learning Kant's philosophy. Introduction to Kant's Anthropology (French: Introduction à l'Anthropologie) was devised by seminal historian of ideas Michel Foucault in the 1960s and depicts Foucault's desires in evaluating the differences between various peoples across different countries. While Foucault fundamentally appreciated the depth and scope of Kant's arguments, he additionally elaborated a large number of specific points given Foucault's particularly strong views on transcendental thought as a 20th-century philosopher.

Language barriers initially created problems in terms of distributing both of the aforementioned writings. Fortunately, Foucault's work received an English translation and widespread publication in the 2000s. Kant's original work likewise has attracted increased notice over time among differing audiences.

== Origins and arguments ==
=== Background and composition ===
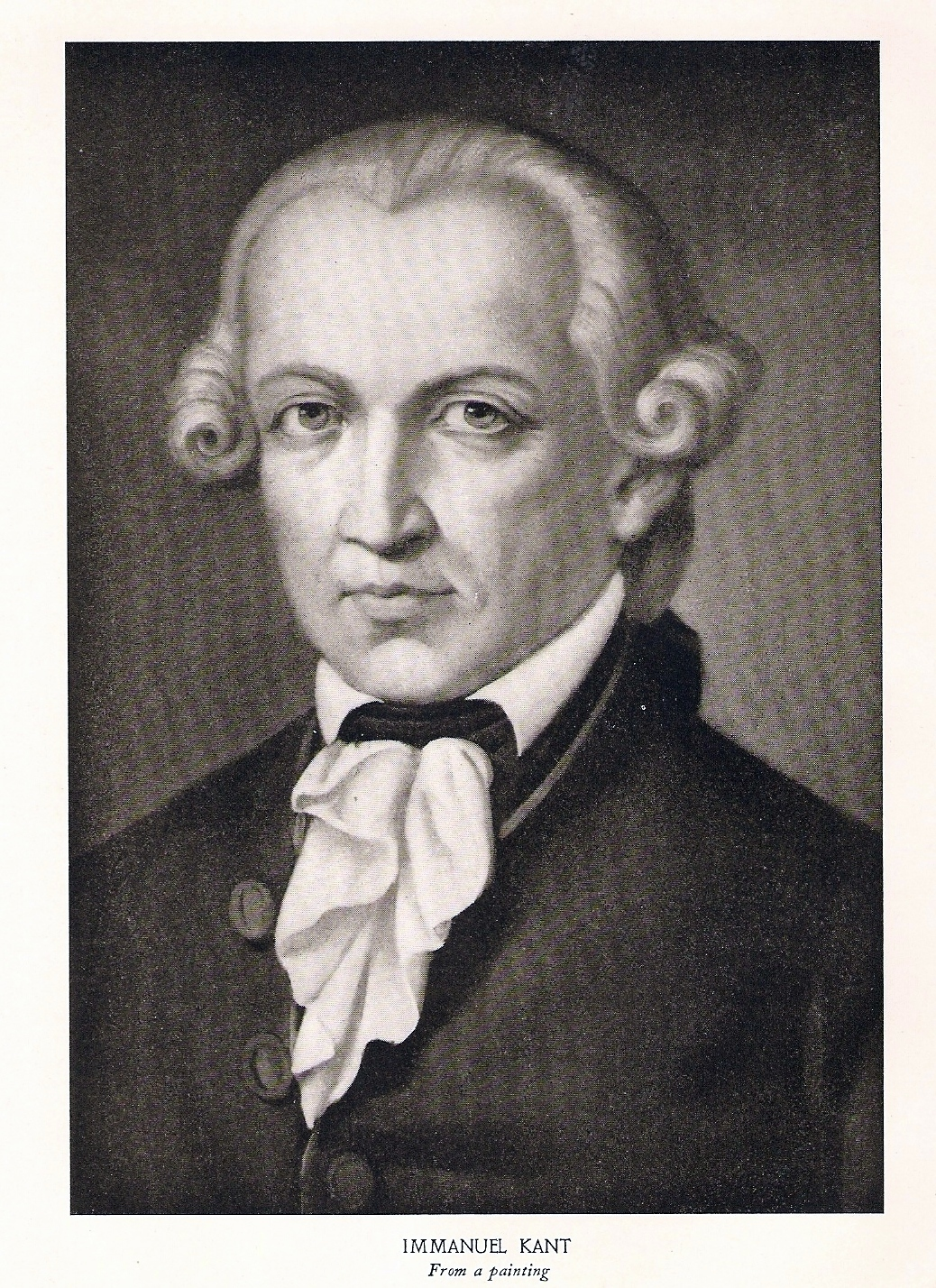
Kant's book sums up the work of his Albertus Universität course and its philosophical explorations, the writing evaluating the intersections of morality and nature within human experience.

Kant's work distills the content that he taught in an annual course at the Albertus Universität in then Königsberg, Germany, a program which Kant set forth from 1772 until his retirement in 1796. The book came out in 1798 with the intent of exposing Kant's viewpoints on the then embryonic intellectual field of anthropology to a wider audience. Despite not being free, unlike other speaking engagements by Kant, the philosopher's classes on the topic had achieved widespread popular interest in contrast to previous attempts to spread his general ideas to the masses.

Anthropology from a Pragmatic Point of View wound up being the last major work of Kant that was edited by the philosopher himself. The strain of his age and the state of his health had significantly affected his writing. Despite the meaning that he attached to the book, those factors meant that he found himself unable to do more much than arrange his lecture notes for publication.

Summing up Kant's views on ideals in the context of the book's composition, scholar Frederick P. Van De Pitte has written,

"Kant realized that man's rational capacity alone is not sufficient to constitute his dignity and elevate him above the brutes. If reason only enables him to do for himself what instinct does for the animal, then it would indicate for man no higher aim or destiny than that of the brute but only a different way of attaining the same end. However, reason is man's most essential attribute because it is the means by which a truly distinctive dimension is made possible for him. Reason, that is, reflective awareness, makes it possible to distinguish between good and bad, and thus morality can be made the ruling purpose of life. Because man can consider an array of possibilities, and which among them is the most desirable, he can strive to make himself and his world into a realization of his ideals."

=== Methodology and views expressed ===
Within the work, Kant remarks that anthropology seeks to answer the fundamental question "what is the human being" and thus can be considered the academic discipline with the highest intellectual scope. A later reviewer commented about Kant's opinions that "[o]ne of the many lessons... is that at the empirical level of application, there is no sharp dividing line between morality and nature, since empirical psychology can function as empirical ethics for this purpose." In conclusion, according to the reviewer, "[h]uman beings in nature are acting, moral beings".

Exploring in multiple aspects the causes and effects of people's behavior, Kant spends many pages on topics such as the biological as well as psychological capacity for individuals to live through and comprehend experiences. For instance, the writing details Kant's views on the external senses as well as the particular nature of different mental states from drunkenness to sleep. He expands to discussions on social organization and interpersonal relations while inserting numerous comments about different types of people as well as various life events. Many of these relate to observations of humanity itself, generally speaking.

Specifically, Kant states that "a mind of slow apprehension is therefore not necessarily a weak mind" since "the one who is alert with abstractions is not always profound" but "is more often very superficial." He argues, "[t]he deceiver is really the fool." On determination and mental resolve, in addition, Kant asserts that "[t]hrough failures one becomes intelligent" and "the one who has trained himself in this subject so that he can make others wise through their own failures... [thus] has used his intelligence." Kant defends what he describes as the seeking of knowledge by even the uncertain layperson, the philosopher arguing "[i]gnorance is not stupidity."

The book additionally features detailed accounts by Kant of him applying his "categorical imperative" concept to various issues in real experience. For example, he writes about the contrast between striving idealism and personal vice, the philosopher writing,

"Young man! Deny yourself satisfaction (of amusement, of debauchery, of love, etc.), not with the Stoical intention of complete abstinence, but with the refined Epicurean intention of having in view an ever-growing pleasure. This stinginess with the cash of your vital urge makes you definitely richer through the postponement of pleasure, even if you should, for the most part, renounce the indulgence of it until the end of your life. The awareness of having pleasure under your control is, like everything idealistic, more fruitful and more abundant than everything that satisfies the sense through indulgence because it is thereby simultaneously consumed and consequently lost from the aggregate of totality."

On the subject of religion, he laments what he sees as unnecessary conflict in terms of cognitive purposes and the regular practice of devotion, Kant remarking,

"What vexations there are in the external customs which are thought to belong to religion, but which in reality are related to ecclesiastical form! The merits of piety have been set up in such away that the ritual is of no use at all except for the simple submission of the believers to ceremonies and observances, expiations and mortifications (the more the better). But such compulsory services, which are mechanically easy (because no vicious inclination is thus sacrificed), must be found morally very difficult and burdensome to the rational man. When, therefore, the great moral teacher said, 'My commandments are not difficult,' he did not mean that they require only limited exercise of strength in order to be fulfilled. As a matter of fact, as commandments which require pure dispositions of the heart, they are the hardest that can be given. Yet, for a rational man, they are nevertheless infinitely easier to keep than the commandments involving activity which accomplishes nothing... [since] the mechanically easy feels like lifting hundredweights to the rational man when he sees that all the energy spent is wasted."

Comparing and contrasting different human groups, Kant makes a variety of assertions about men and women as well as different ethnicities, nationalities, and races. For instance, he writes about the sexes, "[t]he woman wants to dominate, [and] the man wants to be dominated". The philosopher argues in depth that nature "made women mature early and had them demand gentle and polite treatment from men, so that they would find themselves imperceptibly fettered by a child due to their own magnanimity" and additionally "would find themselves brought, if not quite to morality itself, then at least to that which cloaks it, moral behavior". In Kant's eyes, ideal marriage exists in such a way that a woman acts like a monarch while a man acts like a cabinet minister.

In terms of differing nations, Kant asserts that important generalities can be made about the peoples of various areas, stating specifically,

"England and France, the two most civilized nations on earth, who are in contrast to each other because of their different characters, are, perhaps chiefly for that reason, in constant feud with one another. Also, England and France, because of their inborn characters, of which the acquired and artificial character is only the result, are probably the only nations who can be assumed to have a particular and, as long as both national characters are not blended by the force of war, unalterable characteristics. That French has become the universal language of conversation, especially in the feminine world, and that English is the most widely used language of commerce among tradesmen, probably reflects the difference in their continental and insular geographic situation."

In sum, the philosopher views ethical analysis fundamentally as constituting "practical anthropology". He aims not to necessarily assign duties to individuals but to empower them intellectually so that they can properly set their own paths themselves. Dovetailing on the same issues, the concluding section of Anthropology from a Pragmatic Point of View discusses "the character of the species" and evaluates the necessity of giving space for personal freedom as a key element in broader social advancement.

== Analysis and scholarly treatment ==
Scholars Victor L. Dowdell and Hans H. Rudnick have argued that Anthropology from a Pragmatic Point of View constitutes the best way for layperson readers to begin learning Kant's philosophy.

Introduction to Kant's Anthropology (French: Introduction à l'Anthropologie), Michel Foucault's analysis of Kant's book, served as Foucault's secondary thesis (alongside a translation of Kant's work itself plus Foucault's writing Folie et Déraison: Histoire de la folie à l'âge classique) in 1964. While Foucault fundamentally appreciated the depth and scope of Kant's arguments, he additionally elaborated a large number of specific points given Foucault's particularly strong views on transcendental thought.

Foucault's work received an English translation and widespread publication in the 2000s. In his analysis, the French scholar evaluates the question of whether or not psychology has supplanted metaphysics in the evolution of reasoning. He specifically warns against this. Foucault additionally writes that Kant's understandings highlighted the fact that empirical knowledge about human nature has been intrinsically tied up with language. Thus, a person can be considered a citizen of the world insofar as he or she speaks.

== Reception ==
Upon its initial release, Anthropology from a Pragmatic Point of View generated a considerable public response. The book ended up receiving the highest number of printings of any of Kant's works up to that time in its initial run. Despite this, multiple writers considered the work unworthy of serious intellectual analysis. For many years, it became seen as a lesser work in the context of Kant's entire bibliography.

Recent analysis of the book has described it as a vital resource on Kant's thinking. For example, a 2007 article published by the journal Notre Dame Philosophical Reviews labeled it as "increasingly important", with reviewer Frederick Rauscher, a professor at Michigan State University and writer, noting the work's "complex nature" in detailing interesting topics.

== See also ==
- 1798 in literature
- Age of Enlightenment
- Anthropology
- Ethics
- History of ethical idealism
- Immanuel Kant bibliography
  - The Critique of Practical Reason
  - The Groundwork of the Metaphysics of Morals
  - The Metaphysics of Morals
  - Religion Within the Boundaries of Mere Reason
- Introduction to Kant's Anthropology, analysis by Michel Foucault
- Kantianism
- Philosophy of life
