= Idles (disambiguation) =

Idles are a British rock band.

Idles may also refer to:

- Idlès, a town and commune in Algeria
- The Teen Idles or Idles, an American hardcore punk band

== See also ==
- Ideles, in abstract algebra
- Idless, a hamlet in England
- Idle (disambiguation)
- Idols (disambiguation)
