= Idel =

Idel may refer to:

- Moshe Idel, historian and philosopher of Jewish mysticism (born 1947)
- Atil or Itil, the ancient capital of Khazaria
- Itil (river), also Idel, Atil, Atal, the ancient and modern Turkic name of the river Volga
- Ivel, Iran, a village in Mazandaran Province

== See also ==
- Idle (disambiguation)
- Idol (disambiguation)
