= Line 4 (Metrovalencia) =

Overview
- Status: Active
- Owner: Generalitat Valenciana
- Locale: Valencia, Spain
- Termini: Mas del Rosari Lloma Llarga-Terramelar Vicent Andrés Estellés Fira Valencia; Empalme Doctor Lluch
- Stations: 33
- Color on map: Deep blue
- Website: Metrovalencia official site

Service
- Type: Tram
- System: Metrovalencia
- Route number: 4
- Operator(s): FGV
- Ridership: 8,278,619 (2024)

History
- Opened: 1994

Technical
- Line length: 15.921 km (9.89 mi)
- Number of tracks: Double track
- Character: At-grade (tram)
- Track gauge: 1,000 mm (3 ft 3 3/8 in) metre gauge
- Electrification: 750 V DC overhead line
- Operating speed: 60 km/h (37 mph)

Line 4 is a light rail service that forms part of the Metrovalencia network. It links the Port of Valencia with the municipalities of Paterna and Burjassot, running through the historic Pont de Fusta station. The line opened on May 21, 1994. During major trade events, some services are extended to the Fira València exhibition center.

The line was created by transforming a former suburban railway branch between Empalme and Pont de Fusta into a modern tramway.

== History ==
Line 4 was established by converting two former trenet de València (suburban railway) branches into a modern tramway: the line between Empalme and Pont de Fusta, which had been replaced by Line 1, and the route that once connected Pont de Fusta with the Grau de València. The line officially opened on May 21, 1994, marking the revival of tram service in Spain after its disappearance in the 1970s.

Over time, the line has undergone several extensions to the west. In March 1999, a branch was opened to serve the headquarters of the Valencian public broadcaster and the Burjassot campus of the University of Valencia. Later that same year, in September 1999, another branch was added to provide service to Fira València during trade events. A further 3-kilometer (2-mile) extension, serving the neighborhoods of Valterna and Terramelar in Paterna, entered operation on September 23, 2005.

Service on the line was temporarily suspended from October 30 to November 8, 2024, due to severe flooding in the province of Valencia. Regular service was restored on January 7, 2025, upon the completion of repair work on the line.
