= Ismael Merlo =

Spanish actor (1918–1984)

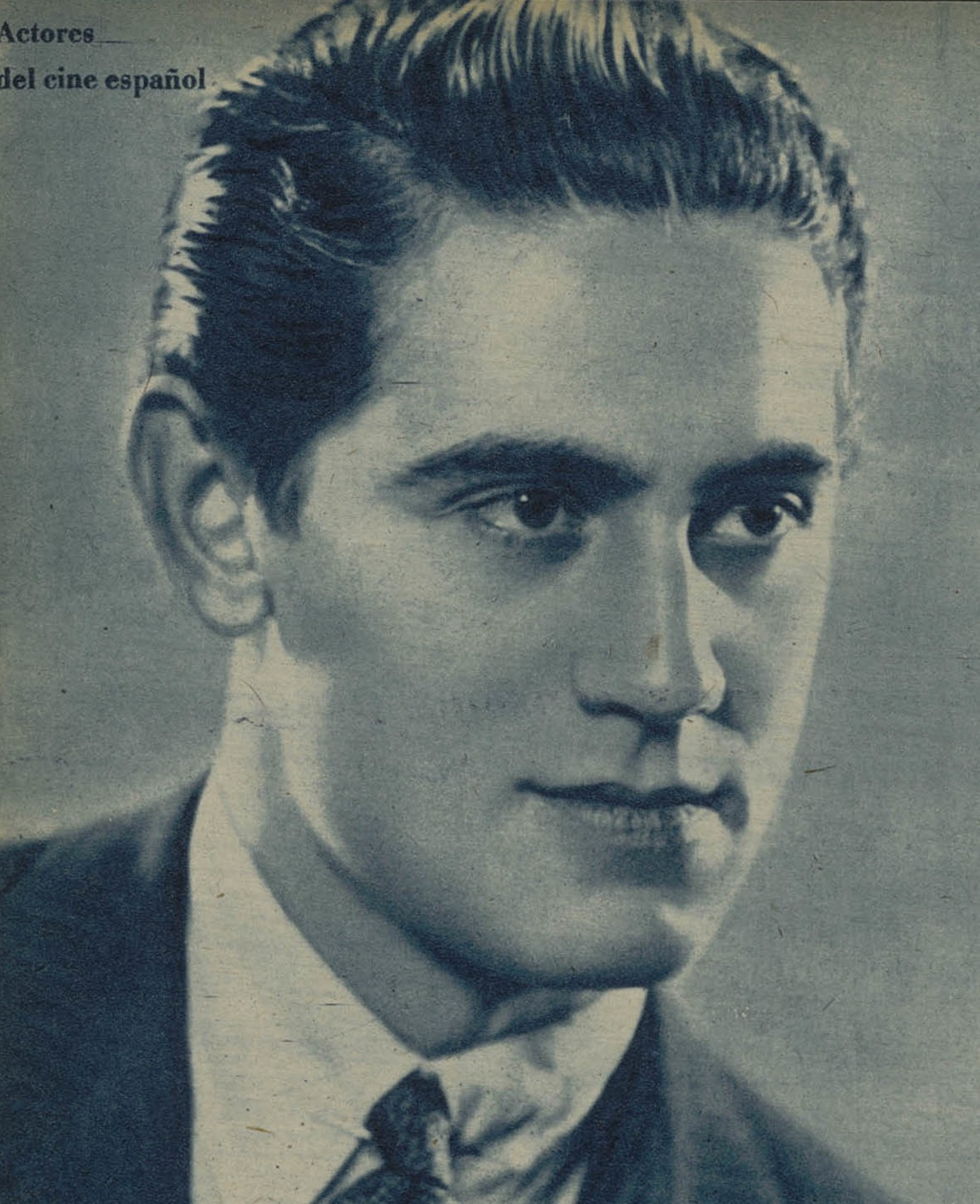
- Born: 1 September 1918; Valencia, Spain
- Died: 10 September 1984 (aged 66); Madrid, Spain
- Occupation: Actor
- Years active: 1914–1984

Ismael Merlo (1 September 1918 – 10 September 1984) was a Spanish actor. He appeared in 82 films and television shows between 1941 and 1984. He starred in the 1966 film La caza, which won the Silver Bear for Best Director at the 16th Berlin International Film Festival.

== Partial filmography ==
- Stowaway on Board (1941) - Antonciño
- Rojo y negro (1942) - Miguel
- The Wheel of Life (1942) - Alberto del Vall
- No te niegues a vivir (1942)
- La niña está loca (1943) - Enrique
- Cristina Guzmán (1943) - Marqués de Atalanta
- Idols (1943) - Juan Luis Gallardo
- Cuento de hadas (1951) - Jaime
- La moza de cántaro (1954) - Felipe IV
- Pescando millones (1959)
- Llegaron los franceses (1959)
- La fiel infantería (1960) - Andrés
- Litri and His Shadow (1960) - Pepe Aguayo
- Three Ladies (1960) - Dr. San Román
- Ventolera (1962) - Máximo
- Aprendiendo a morir (1962) - Rafael Sánchez
- La viudita naviera (1962) - Santiago Filgueras
- Mentirosa (1962) - Chili
- Los que no fuimos a la guerra (1962) - Pons
- You and Me Are Three (1962) - Dr. Alberto Cendreras
- Sabían demasiado (1962) - Don Rafael, 'El cajero'
- Escuela de seductoras (1962) - Enrique
- Trigo limpio (1962) - Jerónimo
- Llovidos del cielo (1962)
- Esa pícara pelirroja (1963) - Pablo Corell
- El sol en el espejo (1963) - Salazar
- La pandilla de los once (1963) - Toni antes del cambio imagen
- La batalla del domingo (1963) - El risitas
- Trampa mortal (1963) - Don Tomás
- El precio de un asesino (1963) - John Berstein
- La chica del trébol (1964) - D. Andrés
- A Canção da Saudade (1964) - Leonel
- La boda era a las doce (1964) - Andrés
- Fin de semana (1964) - Don Alejandro Orteu
- Los gatos negros (1964)
- La caza (1966) - José
- Las viudas (1966) - Médico del Hotel (segment "El Aniversario")
- Jugando a morir (1966) - Empresario
- The Cannibal Man (1972) - Jefe de personal
- Experiencia prematrimonial (1972) - Andrés, padre de Alejandra
- Flor de santidad (1973) - Electus, el ciego
- Las señoritas de mala compañía (1973) - Don Pedro
- Tormento (1974) - Padre Nones
- Una pareja... distinta (1974) - Manolo
- The Marriage Revolution (1974) - Padre de Begoña
- La madrastra (1974) - Marcos
- Furtivos (1975) - Cura
- Las protegidas (1975) - Ignacio Aguirre
- Madrid, Costa Fleming (1976) - Sr. Conca
- Las largas vacaciones del 36 (1976) - El Abuelo
- Los hijos de... (1976) - Mauricio
- Climax (1977) - Don Rafael / Art teacher
- Paco l'infaillible (1979) - Marqués
- La campanada (1980) - Padre
- The Autonomines (1983) - Don Ángel
- Los hermanos Cartagena (1984) - Padre de Daniel
