= Plaza de Toros de La Merced =

Bullring in Huelva, Spain

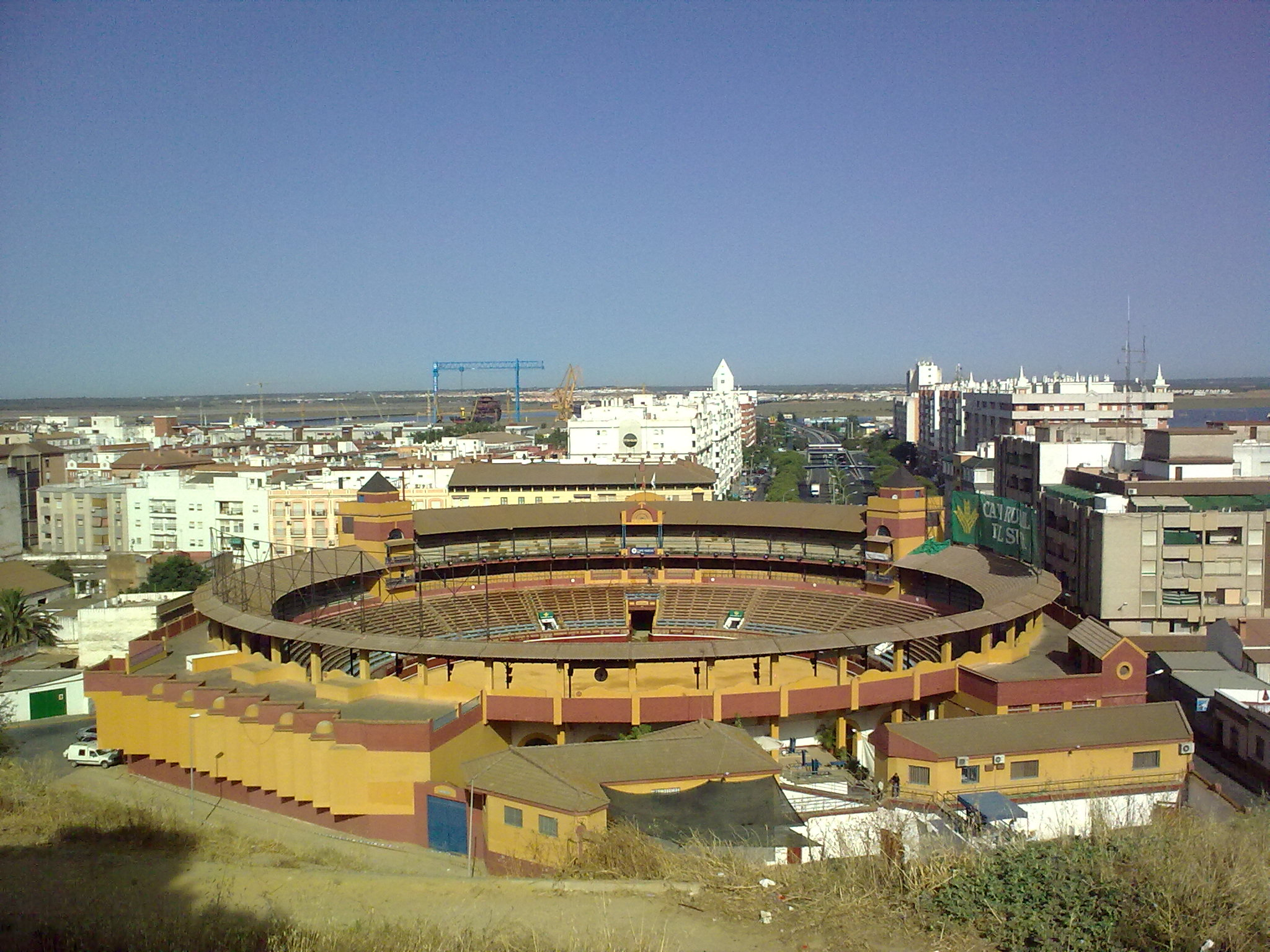
- Interactive map of Plaza de Toros de La Merced
- Full name: Plaza de Toros de La Merced
- Location: Huelva, Spain
- Coordinates: 37.265583°N 6.951694°W
- Owner: Private
- Operator: Espectáculos Taurinos La Merced, S.L.
- Capacity: 7127
- Surface: 1963.5 m^{2}
- Field shape: Circular
- Current use: Bullring
- Public transit: Avda. Alemania (Plaza de Toros) bus stop

Construction
- Built: 1899–1902
- Opened: 5 September 1902
- Renovated: 1984
- Architects: Trinidad Gallego Díaz (1899–1902); Luis Marquínez Marquínez (1984)

Website
- https://www.plazadetorosdehuelva.es

The Plaza de Toros de La Merced is a bullring in the Andalusian city of Huelva, Spain. The current building, which was reinaugurated in 1984 after being rehabilitated by architect Luis Marquínez, is an updated version of an old bullring, built in the years 1899 to 1902 and designed by architect Trinidad Gallego y Díaz. For years, it stood empty as bullfights were instead held at another, newer bullring that eventually had to fall to the wrecker's ball when it turned out to be unsafe. In its more than one hundred years of existence, the Merced bullring has borne witness to not only authentic glory in the Bull Festival, but also to the bullfighting figures from all eras who have filed through it. The rehabilitated bullring's foreseen capacity was 10,000, but its actual current capacity is 7,127.

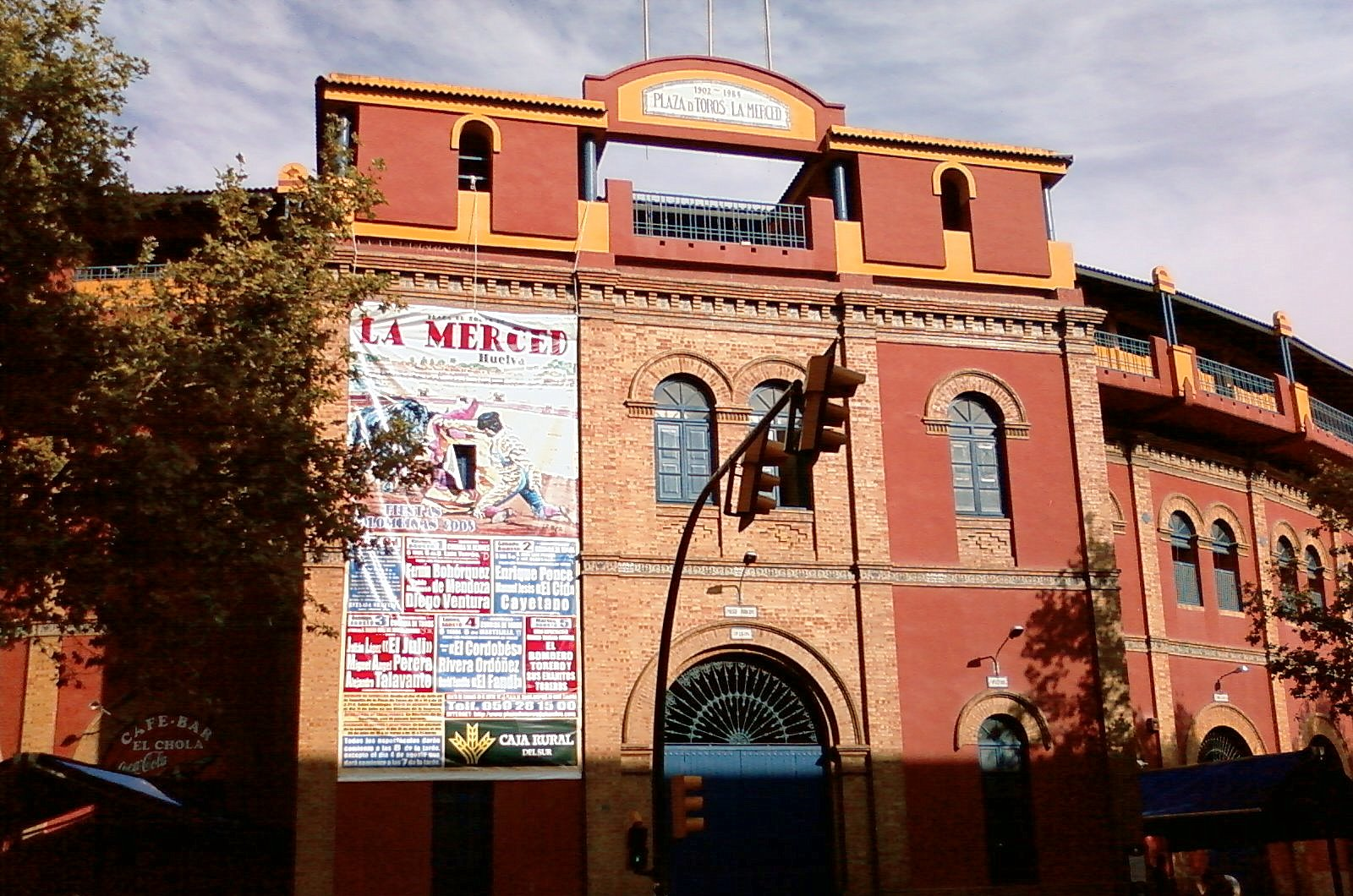
Current main façade.

== 1902 bullring ==
Today's Merced bullring is a revived version of one that has long been standing at this same site. The complex covers a land area of some twelve thousand square metres, with the main building in the shape of a 48-sided regular polygon (a "tetracontakaioctagon"). It stands on the site where, until the 1890s, there was a wooden, two-storey bullring with seating for some 6,000 bullfight-goers and a bullfighting ground (ruedo) 45 m across, but the desire for a more up-to-date structure swept this old bullring away.

Leading the drive for a more modern bullring – earlier ones in Huelva had always been wooden – was Claudio Saavedra Navarro, the president of the administrative council of the Plaza de Toros Corporation, and indeed, La Merced was Huelva's first bullring built out of manufactured building materials. The project's foreseen cost was 150,000 pesetas.

The ring was constructed of ordinary brick with neat cornicing, requiring so many bricks that local brickkilns struggled to meet demand.Built on a solid foundation of hydraulic concrete, the structure utilized the material for both structural support and decorative elements. The bullfighting ground (ruedo) measures 50 metres across, surrounded by a 1.8-metre-wide callejón (the perimeter passage for bullfighters). Behind the callejón is a barrier row with a 70-centimetre-wide passage leading to the seating area, which consists of fourteen rows accessed via nine broad entrances. A wide staircase leads to thirty-six upper seating boxes sheltered by a balcony, including a cantilevered presidential box designed with three times the capacity of a standard box.

The main gate opens to the west in such a way that, with the presidential box above it, the bullring is divided, according to the general plan, into two halves: the sunny half, and the shady half. Before this gate stands an eight-stall bullpen, and on the right and the left are the gates for the bullfighters and the dragging of the dead bulls, and the gates for the picadores and the dragging of the dead horses respectively. (Note: In earlier times, the picador's horse was not armoured in any way, and was often killed by the bull; at one corrida in Huelva on 2 August 1891, eight horses were slain.)

The building contains bull corrals, backrooms, a halter shop, a skinning room, and horse stalls, along with rooms used for bullfighting festivals, including a chapel, an infirmary, a first aid room, a bullfighters' room, a tack room, bullfighters' assistants' rooms, veterinary clinics, and caretakers' offices.

The bullring in its former incarnation (before 1968) could handle six thousand five hundred spectators, who would come into the venue through eight great gates, including the main one. The seating was divided into two kinds of arches, some with an angular shape, with buttresses, while the others were conical, no other material having been used beyond hydraulic concrete for the foundation along with stone, brick, and iron for the rest. It was quite an artistic as well as architectural achievement which honoured provincial architect Trinidad Gallego Díaz's inventiveness.

=== History ===
Lying right by one of the slopes of the Cabezo del Conquero (a hill), the construction of Huelva's bullring was a great project for business, in which many locals participated, leading to the establishment on 20 November 1886 of the Sociedad Anónima Plaza de Toros de Huelva. Incorporated by deed on that date before the notary Emilio Cano y Cáceres, its founding partners were the Huelva industrialists Francisco Jiménez y Jiménez, Lorenzo Navarro Lairado, Antonio Martínez Victoria, Fernando José Pérez Machado, Manuel Pérez Barroso, Manuel Vélez Díaz, Eduardo Figueroa y Alarcón, Manuel Carbonel Díaz, Julio Ricca Manini, Ruperto Sánchez Campos, José Bustamante y Peña, Daniel Mey Fanpil, Juan Bautista de Gregorio y de la Riva, and Miguel Blázquez y Jiménez. As soon as the corporation had been set up, the architect Trinidad Gallego was put in charge of the bullring project.

It was not until 1902 that the building was built, after a bullring model that Emilio Rodríguez Ayuso had used for the Fuente del Berro bullring (then still standing, but torn down in 1934) in Madrid, in which Neo-Mudéjar elements were quite prominent. The ring's grand opening was timed to coincide with the Huelva Fair (festive observance of the Virgin of the Ribbon) on 5 September 1902 with bullfights in which the estocadas were delivered by Miguel Báez Quintero "El Litri" and Rafael González Madrid "Machaquito" to bulls supplied by the Marquess of Saltillo.

The Merced bullring's inauguration drew bullfighting aficionados' interest not only in Huelva but in nearby places, too, and likewise aroused interest in the bullfighting world's press. For the occasion, the illustrated magazine Sol y Sombra dedicated several pages to the Huelva Fair and to the great event:

The influx of outsiders for this occasion has been quite enormous, with no other like it having been known since the time of the centenary. Trains arrive packed with travellers, making it difficult for hotel owners, inn keepers, restaurateurs, etc., to provide shelter to all those who, eager to witness the most popular of our festivals, leave their home. Huelva's appearance on bullfighting days is picturesque and lively. The Vega-Larga promenade, where the Virgin of the Ribbon evening is held, offers a surprising view. Huelva's beautiful people, the outsiders who from Seville, Córdoba, Málaga, and neighbouring towns come to witness the festivities, showing off their charms in the streets and squares; the nougat and drink stalls, surrounded by happy people; the music throwing its sounds into the air; a town full of joy, eagerly awaiting the scheduled time to attend the bullfight. It is not yet two o'clock and the movement is already accentuated. Cars, buses, riders on beautiful horses harnessed in the Andalusian style, and a great throng of people on foot walk towards our beautiful ring. Tents and stands are filled; in the boxes, the cream of Andalusia. The attendees, drunk with joy, and waiting for the desired moment, bubble and shake as if propelled by an electric current. Half past four is the set time, the bugles announce the arrival of President José Coto, mayor of the capital, and the beginning of the party. (Sol y Sombra, 25 September 1902)

On 17 June 1954, a novillero (novice bullfighter who fights yearling bulls) from Huelva, Rafael Carbonell Ramos, was badly gored in the bullring, dying a short time afterwards at the bullring's own infirmary.

== 1968 Monumental bullring ==
As the years went by and the aficionados declined in number, the bullring fell into a half-ruined state. It was therefore decided that a new bullring was needed, and thus, on 2 August 1968, the new Plaza de toros Monumental de Huelva was opened on the city's fairgrounds. Billed as the bullfighters that day were Miguel Báez Espuny "El Litri", Ángel Teruel, and Manuel Benítez "El Cordobés", with bulls supplied by the Celestino Cuadri ranch. However, this new bullring was shortlived. The enormous structure – it had a seating capacity of 14,000 – had been built too near the Ría de Huelva (a ria) and it turned out that there were flaws in its design, which inevitably led to its closure in 1982, leaving the city for a while without a place to celebrate bullfighting spectacles; the Monumental bullring was torn down in 1997.

== Rehabilitated 1984 La Merced bullring ==
Businessmen turned their eyes to the old La Merced bullring, in particular a local one named José Luis Pereda García, who hitherto had had no links to the bullfighting world at all. He, however, put forth the idea to city council of acquiring the old bullring, which was still standing but by then in a sorry state. Negotiations were difficult, but Huelva's then mayor José Antonio Marín Rite eventually thought it was worth the risk. La Merced was thus restored according to architect Luis Marquínez's plans in 1984. La Merced was reinaugurated on 29 July of that year with bullfighters "El Litri" (who made one of his sporadic appearances, having given up regular ones in 1967), Curro Romero, and Pepe Luis Vázquez on the bill and bulls supplied by the Jandilla ranch. "El Litri" slew the first bull at the newly revived bullring, whose name was Juanillo.

Since then, the Merced bullring has become one of the foremost in Andalusia, and it enjoys ample patronage. It is currently run by the corporation Espectáculos Taurinos La Merced, S.L., headed by Carlos Pereda and Santiago Arroyo.

== Bullfighting fair ==
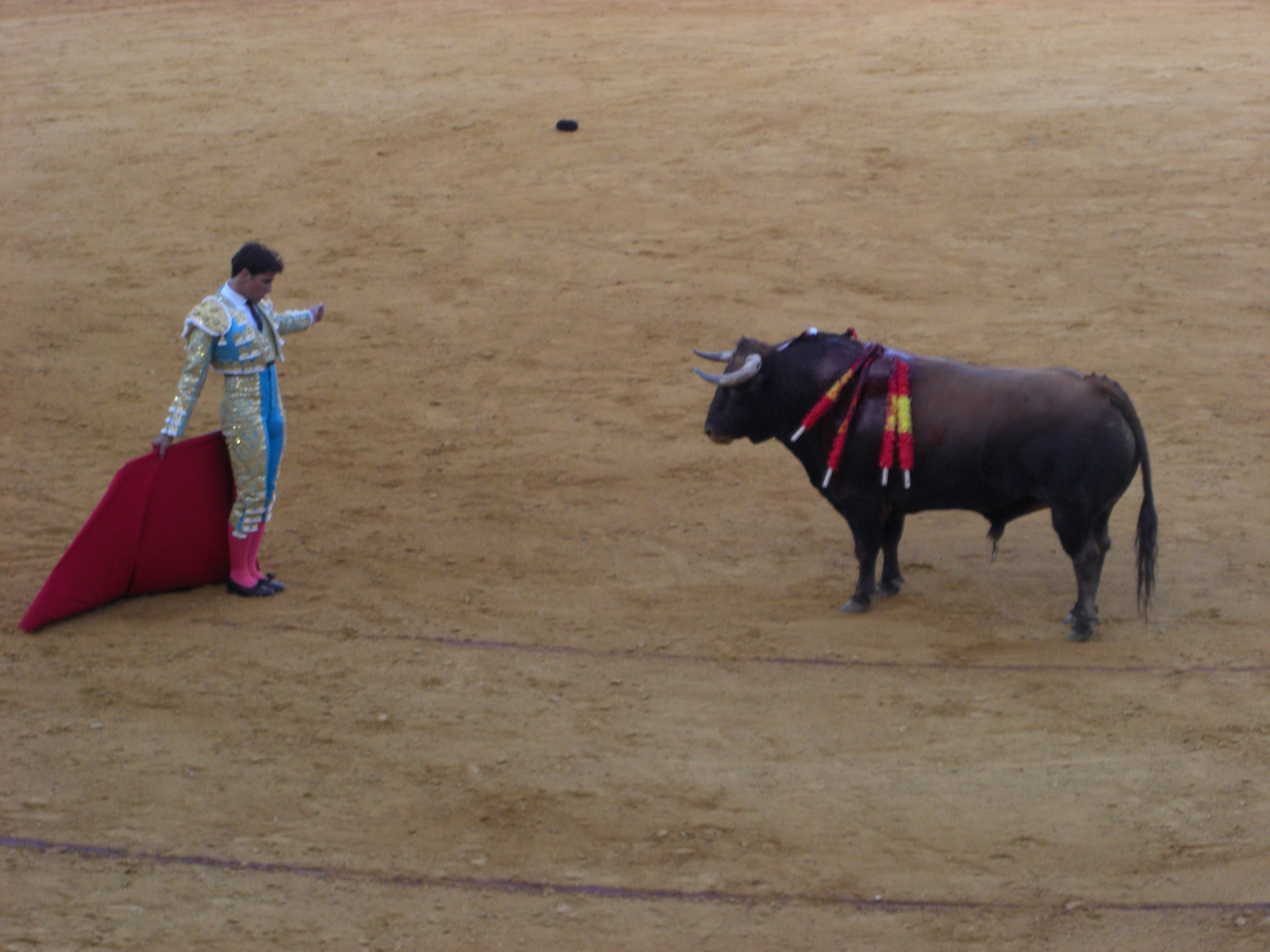
Francisco Rivera Ordóñez faces down a bull at the 2008 Columbian Festivals.

Huelva's bullfighting fair (Feria Taurina) has begun since time immemorial in the month of May or June, arising as it does from the Feast of Corpus Christi, and stretched on to the celebration of the Huelva Fair (Feria de Huelva, linked with the Sanctuary of Our Lady of the Ribbon) in September. Throughout these months, the city's most important bullfighting events would be held.

The first bullfight in the Columbian Festivals of which there is a record was one held on 2 August 1891, for the upcoming quadricentenary of Columbus's discovery of America. The celebrations were organized by city council and the Real Sociedad Colombina Onubense ("Huelva Royal Columbine Society"), (Note: "Onubense" is a Spanish adjective that refers to the city of Huelva; it derives from the city's Ancient Roman name.) with bullfights undertaken by matadors Antonio Arana y Carmona "Jarana" and "Litri", with bulls supplied by the Ibarra ranch.

In 1892, within the framework of the programme of the quadricentenary, a corrida was held in which four bulls from the Clemente ranch fought the Seville bullfighter Manuel García Cuesta El Espartero o Maolillo.

There was after this date a great gap of almost thirty years without bulls at the Columbian Festivals, which were not held with any regularity until after 1920. Among the most important corridas was the one held on 2 August 1924, in which six bulls from the Conradi ranch faced Juan Belmonte, his brother Manuel Belmonte, and Manuel del Pozo "Rayito". The next year, a celebration was organized for 3 August at which Manuel Báez Gómez "El Litri" was presented with the Golden Ear, which he had won on the 16th of the previous month at the bullfights held by the Madrid Press Association. He alternated with Manuel Báez, Manuel Jiménez Moreno "Chicuelo", and Antonio de la Haba "Zurito".

Later, the bullfighting celebrations at the Columbian Festivals were for several years organized by the city's traders. The most memorable in the bullring's annals was that held in 1932, which featured bulls supplied by the Arias de Reina ranch to bullfighters Domingo Ortega, Manuel Bienvenida, and his brother José Bienvenida, the best bill of that era. Foremost in this corrida is the memory of the afternoon's fourth bull, with which Ortega performed one of the best series of passes (a "faena") in his bullfighting life.

As of 2024, the bullfighting festivities at La Merced also include a "Children's Running of the Bulls" — which does not, however, use real bulls. The inflatable bulls are pushed along on carts behind the children as they run. The event also includes "play bullfighting" (likewise safe) and a chance for the children to meet some of Spain's bullfighting stars. Showing up to the 2024 event, which marked forty years of the bullring's revival, were the bullring's driving business force, José Luis Pereda García (mentioned earlier) and bullfighters Guillermo Luna, Enrique Toro, and Carlos Tirado; the bull rancher Marcelino Acosta was also there.

== Bullfighting museum ==
In 2014, planning was underway to open a bullfighting museum at La Merced, and the manager was in talks with various prominent bullfighters, hoping to get them to contribute a few of their suits of lights or capes.
