= Introduction to Kant's Anthropology =

2008 essay

- Author: Michel Foucault
- Language: French
- Subject: Anthropology from a Pragmatic Point of View
- Publisher: Semiotext(e)
- Publication date: 2008
- Publication place: France
- Media type: Print (Paperback)
- Pages: 124
- ISBN: 978-1-58435-054-5
- OCLC: 153578160

Introduction to Kant's Anthropology (French: Introduction à l'Anthropologie) is an introductory essay to Michel Foucault's translation of Immanuel Kant's 1798 book Anthropology from a Pragmatic Point of View — a textbook deriving from lectures he delivered annually between 1772/73 and 1795/96. Both works together served as his secondary thesis (his major being Folie et Déraison: Histoire de la folie à l'âge classique), although Foucault's translation of the Anthropology was published separately by Vrin in 1964. The introduction was published in an English translation by Arianna Bove on generation-online.org in 2003.

== Overview ==
Foucault holds that in Kant's Anthropology, the conditions of possibility of experience (transcendental subjectivity) are referred back to the empirical existence of the subject. That is to say, in an attempt to understand how we experience the world Kant inaugurates the idea of studying ourselves as empirical objects. However, since Kant has made clear in the Critique of Pure Reason that the transcendental subject cannot exist within chronology, since it is the starting point of knowledge (it is within time in the sense that things happen to it, but it is outside of time in the sense that causal changes amongst phenomena require our transcendental perception in order to become chronological) then a contradiction arises regarding the possibility of the transcendental subject being the starting point of an understanding of the limits of knowledge:

…the relation of the given and of the a priori takes a reverse structure in the Anthropology to that revealed in the Critique. The a priori in the order of knowledge, becomes in the order of concrete existence an originary which is not chronologically first but which, as soon as it appears…reveals itself as already there.

Thus, the transcendental subject - man as the ultimate a priori (requiring no empirical study in order to be known to exist) that as the basis of thought is the foundation of all empirical knowledge - cannot be the basis of knowledge if, simultaneously, it can be investigated as an object of that knowledge. If it is an object of knowledge, then it exists chronologically, within things to be perceived, and therefore requires ordering by our perception. If that is the case, then it is constantly both present and not present, pre-existing enquiry and existing within enquiry, and therefore leading to an oscillation between knowing subject and subject to be known.

This has clear implications for phenomenology, existentialism, Marxism and metaphysics generally, all of which dominated French philosophy and social sciences during Foucault's youth. The reliance on the concept of a foundational selfhood, with a coherent relationship between itself as phenomenal subject and the external world, is undermined in the face of a critique that considers one of the foundation stones of modern philosophy – Kant's transcendental idealism – to be simultaneously contradicted by the concept of anthropology. Thus, Foucault warns against an anthropology that seeks to provide a metaphysical account of man:

One aim has been to make anthropology count as a Critique, as a critique liberated from the prejudices and the dead weight of the a priori, overlooking the fact that it can give access to the realm of the fundamental only if [it] remains under the sway of critical thought. Another (which is just another version of the same oversight) has been to turn anthropology into a positive field which would serve as the basis for and the possibility of all the human sciences, whereas in fact it can only speak the language of limit and negativity: its sole purpose is to convey, from the vigour of critical thought to the transcendental foundation, the precedence of finitude.

This concern with anthropology as "limit and negativity" would animate Foucault's future work: The Order of Things would continue his critique of the doubling of man as subject and object in the form of the "Analytic of Finitude", whilst work such as The Birth of the Clinic or Madness and Civilization both outline the emergence of anthropological institutions that sought to order humans negatively, as objects to be limited, defined and restricted. However, the end of the Introduction to Kant's Anthropology also demonstrates the relationship with Nietzsche that would become important in the 1970s and 80s, since Foucault makes clear that the question "What is man?" is rendered impotent by the concept of the Übermensch: "The trajectory of the question Was ist der Mensch? in the field of philosophy reaches its end in the response which both challenges and disarms it: der Übermensch." The relationship between Kant and Nietzsche would be expanded in the 1984 essay "What is Enlightenment?"

A thoroughgoing critical assessment of Foucault's views on Kant is still missing. For instance, Foucault seems to have been mostly unaware of the proper historical contexts of Kant's anthropology: the lectures it was based upon, his discussion of the views of authors such as Christian Wolff, Alexander Baumgarten, David Hume, or Johann Nicolas Tetens, and the distinctive conception of the human sciences he developed as a result. Although Foucault does mention a number of these figures:

Kant was aware of them and made use of them in his Anthropology. At the top of this list we should probably put Tetens' Versuch über die menschliche Natur (1777), Platner's Anthropology (1772), and of course Baumgarten's Psychologia Empirica (1749).

== See also ==
- Anthropology
- Kantianism
