= Litri and His Shadow =

- Directed by: Rafael Gil
- Written by: Rafael Gil; Agustín de Foxá
- Starring: El Litri; Katia Loritz; Ismael Merlo
- Cinematography: José F. Aguayo; Michel Kelber
- Edited by: Antonio Ramírez de Loaysa
- Music by: Manuel Parada
- Production company: Coral Producciones Cinematográficas
- Release date: 2 February 1960
- Running time: 90 minutes
- Country: Spain
- Language: Spanish

Litri and His Shadow (Spanish:El Litri y su sombra) is a 1960 Spanish drama film directed by Rafael Gil and starring Miguel Báez Espuny "El Litri", Katia Loritz and Ismael Merlo. It is set in the world of bullfighting.

== Cast ==
- El Litri (Miguel Báez) as Litri
- Katia Loritz as Katia
- Ismael Merlo as Pepe Aguayo
- Pilar Cansino as Carmela
- María de los Ángeles Hortelano as Ángeles
- Pepe Rubio as Manuel Báez
- Jorge Vico as Pelopunta
- Roberto Rey as Viejo 'Litri'
- Rafael Bardem as Don Alberto
- Miguel Ángel Rodríguez as Pelopunta niño
- Rosina Mendía as Sra. Pinzón
- Luisa Hernán as Pepita
- Manuel Arbó as Sr. Pinzón
- Manolita Barroso
- Julio Goróstegui as Director del colegio
- Erasmo Pascual as Don Durezas
- Morenito de Talavera hijo as Litri niño
- Ángel María Baltanás as Narrator (voice)
- Manolo Morán as Naranjito
- José Isbert as Hermano Alejandro
- Licia Calderón as Lucía

== Bibliography ==
- Bentley, Bernard. A Companion to Spanish Cinema. Boydell & Brewer 2008.
