= Columbian Festivals =

The Columbian Festivals (Spanish: Fiestas Colombinas, popularly just Las Colombinas) are a set of annual celebrations in the city of Huelva, Andalusia to commemorate the first voyage of Christopher Columbus. They occur for a week at the end of July and beginning of August, the main day being 3 August, the date in 1492 on which Columbus departed Palos de la Frontera, on the voyage that brought him to the Americas. The festivities have been declared to be of National Tourist Interest (de Interés Turístico Nacional).

== Early years ==
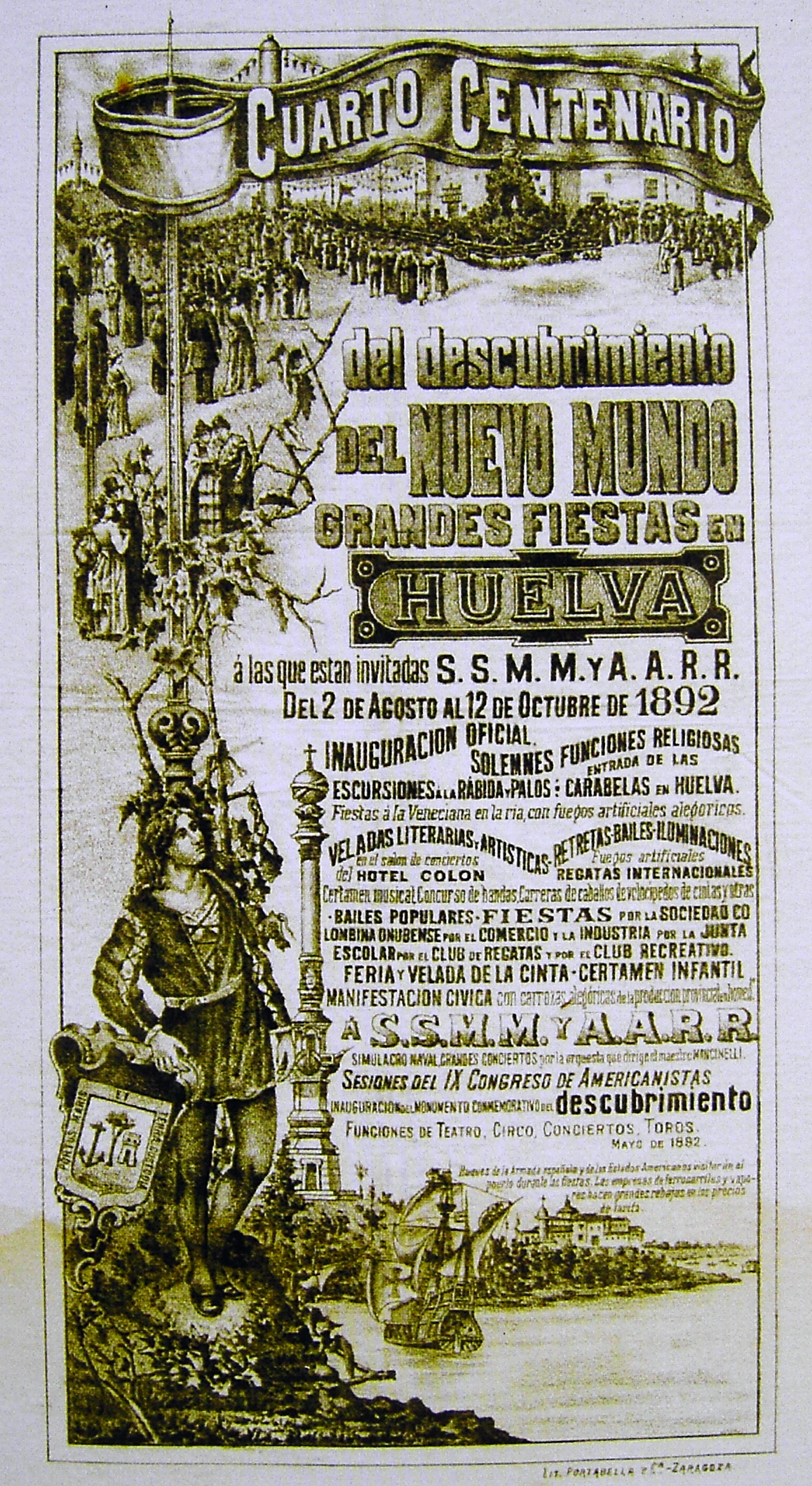
Poster announcing the Grandes Fiestas 1892 on the 400th anniversary of Columbus's first voyage.

As Pedro Rodríguez, mayor of Huelva, remarked in 1999, the Columbian Festivals are atypical of Andalusia in that they are not rooted in religion.

Although Huelva has had religious festivals at least since the 17th century—a pilgrimage day in the month of September honors the city's patron, the Virgin of La Cinta—toward the end of the 19th century sentiment began to arise for the recognition of the province of Huelva for its role in Columbus's first voyage, and what had come to be known as the Discovery of the Americas. As the celebration of the fourth centenary of the Discovery of the Americas approached, there was an intent to draw attention to the Lugares colombinos, the places in Moguer and Palos de la Frontera associated with the voyage. This movement began around 1880, led by the recently created Real Sociedad Colombina Onubense (Royal Columbian Society of Huelva), who revived a similar idea initially put forward by Civil Governor Mariano Alonso y Castillo in 1855.

The first occurrence of the Columbian Festivals was an immediate success in Huelva and in nearby Palos de la Frontera. Setting the nautical tone, the Captain General of the Maritime Department of Cádiz, Luis Hernández-Pinzón Álvarez, descendant of co-discoverer of the Americas, Martín Alonso Pinzón, attended on August 3. Several vessels of the Spanish Navy were also present. More than 15,000 people gathered at the Monastery of La Rábida in Palos for a "disembarkation" of the Spanish navy and for a fireworks show.

Despite the city already having the festival of La Cinta, the new festivities took root rapidly. In those early years, the festivities included outdoor masses, literary competitions, visits to La Rábida, and traditional sporting competitions. Beginning in 1925, when the Círculo Mercantil set up a booth, there began to be a massive celebration at the city quayside. From this point, the classic elements of an Andalusian fair began to attach themselves to the Columbian Festivals: booths (casetas: some of these are larger structures than is perhaps suggested by the English-language word "booth"), attractions, raffles, and spaces set aside for dancing.

The importance of the festivals in this era can be seen in the descriptions of them in the local press, such as this in 1924:

Every day one notes more animation for these patriotic festivals, that go far beyond the celebrations in earlier years.

And on the special illumination for the festivals:

Incredibly beautiful arches have been placed on the waterfront promenade, as well as on the promenades of Las Palmeras (the Palms) and El Balneario (the Baths), which will provide an unprecedented class of illumination, which has already come to be celebrated in all justice by the general public.

As for the presence of the Spanish Navy:

… it is expected that several warships will have anchored in our waters, to which effect Mister Marchena Colombo, president of the Columbian Society, has received a letter from the general in charge of the Naval department, announcing that the largest number of ships that circumstances permit will come to Huelva.

And on the institutional celebrations of 3 August commemorating Columbus's departure from Palos de la Frontera:

As is customary, on the third, the authorities of Huelva and associates of the Columbian Society will leave for La Rábida, where they will celebrate a mass in commemoration of that heard by Columbus and his intrepid co-voyagers before their departure from the port of Palos.

=== Growth and crisis of the festivities ===
Over the years, the Columbian Festivals began to become Huelva's leading celebration, winning out over religious and academic festivals, and became increasingly a festival of entertainment with massive attendance. It outgrew the capacity of its waterfront site and in 1943 moved to a less contained space, the Interior Port of Huelva.

Despite this expansion, and despite continuing to hold the fair in a maritime-related location, the maritime spirit of the festival began to fade, as can be seen in the complaint of then-mayor Francisco Montenegro, expressing openly that in comparison with his youth:

… those festivals that we came to know in our childhood years came closer to our hearts. And it was that they had more flavor of the sea and more emotion in its spiritual and evocative sense. They didn't hang so many fair lanterns on the old quayside promenades, but on the other hand the battleships Reina Regente and Pelayo, together with other warships, filled the streets with white uniforms when the sailors came ashore.

By 1965, the celebrations were displaced a kilometer further south of the city, to what was then known as Avenida Francisco Montenegro, near the present-day Estadio Nuevo Colombino ("New Columbian Stadium"). The structure of the fair was similar today's, although the booths were large permanent constructions, in open air to take advantage of the cool of the August nights. Three years later, the bullfighting arena Plaza Monumental de Toros de Huelva opened adjacent to the fairgrounds; it ended up being demolished in the 1990s. This was a time of economic and demographic growth in the city thanks establishment of a development center (Polo de Desarrollo). Many of the new and growing businesses established their own booths in the fair district. Nonetheless, there was a decline in the late 20th century, and the city government—which needed land for a new football (soccer)—moved the fairgrounds again beginning in the year 2000. That year, a tradition began of dedicating a gate each year to a provincial building or institution.

== Las Colombinas today ==
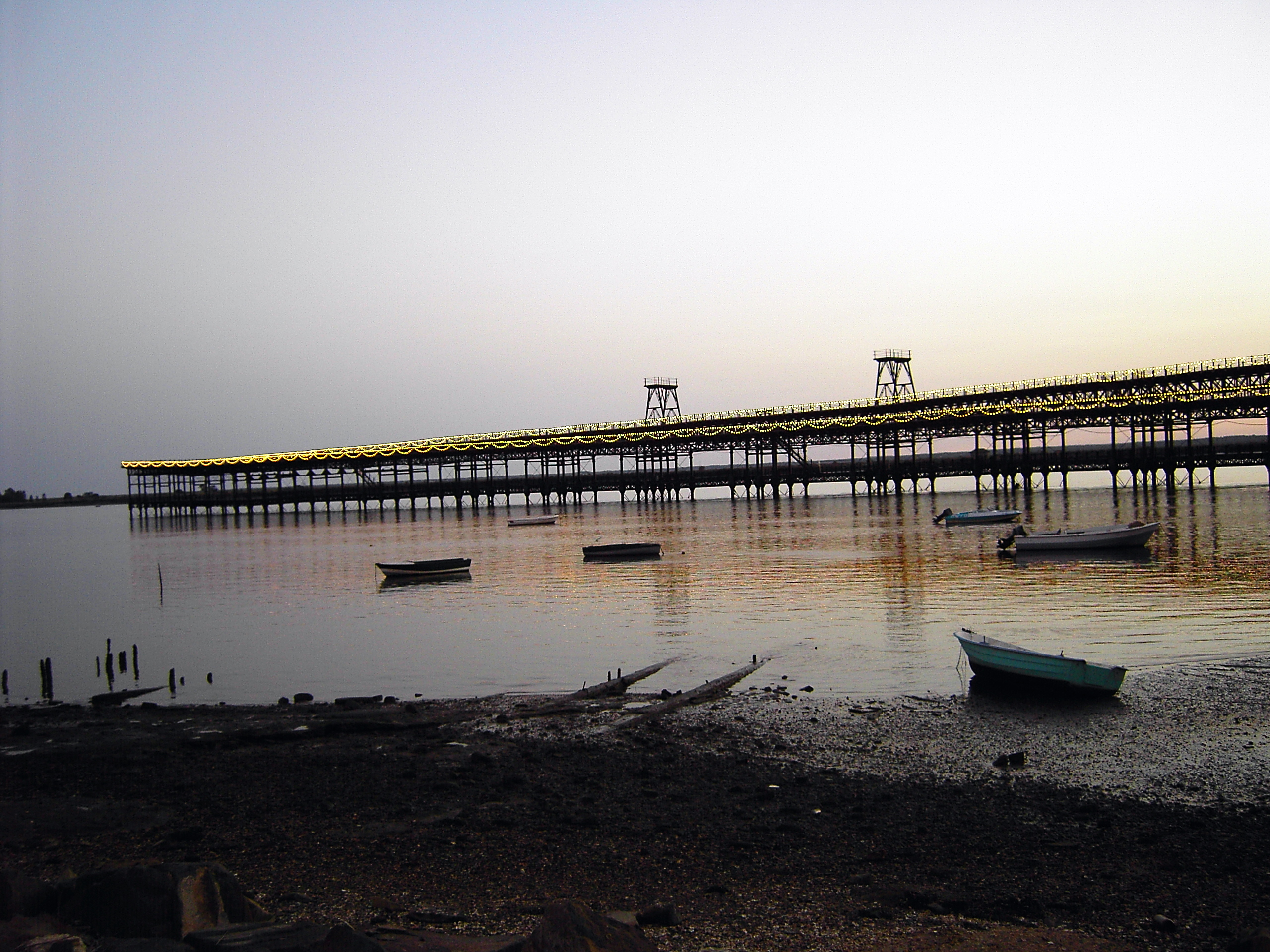
The quay on the Rio Tinto, illuminated for the festivities.

Today Las Colombinas is one of the most important fairs in Andalusia, a fair "of National Tourist Interest," with over 600,000 visits for its largely nocturnal schedule of activities. The fair district has been located since 2000 along the Huelva estuary, quite near its location from 1965 to 1999 and not far from the city center, adjacent to the Estadio Nuevo Colombino. Visitors enter the fair district through an entrance that is designed in imitation of an emblematic building of the city or province of Huelva (the "La Rábida" Institute, Casa Colón, the bullring of La Merced, the Gran Teatro, the Sanctuary of the Virgin of El Rocío, Columbus's ship the Santa María, etc.).

The fair district is 31,818 square metres (342,490 sq ft), with 68 booths (with a design similar to that of the Seville Fair, with blue and white awnings). The streets in the fair district take names of characteristic places in the city: Muelle del Tinto, De las Canoas, Marismas del Titán, Punta del Sebo, and Club Marítimo de Huelva. There is also an area with about 70 attractions. The celebrations culminate with an interpretation of the Himno de Huelva ("Anthem of Huelva"), the pasodoble Mi Huelva tiene una ría by Maestro Molero, and a 45-minute fireworks display by pyrotechnicians from Valencia.

Each year's festivals are dedicated to some Spanish city, Latin American country or some event of regional significance. Dedicatees in recent years have included Palos de la Frontera, Moguer, Cuba, the city of San Sebastián, the Canary Islands, Galicia, the Algarve (Portugal), Almería, Madrid, Ceuta, Denominaciones de origen de Huelva, El Rocío, Recreativo de Huelva, to the history of the festivals themselves, and—in 2008—to 175 years of Huelva's status as a provincial capital.

== Bullfighting ==
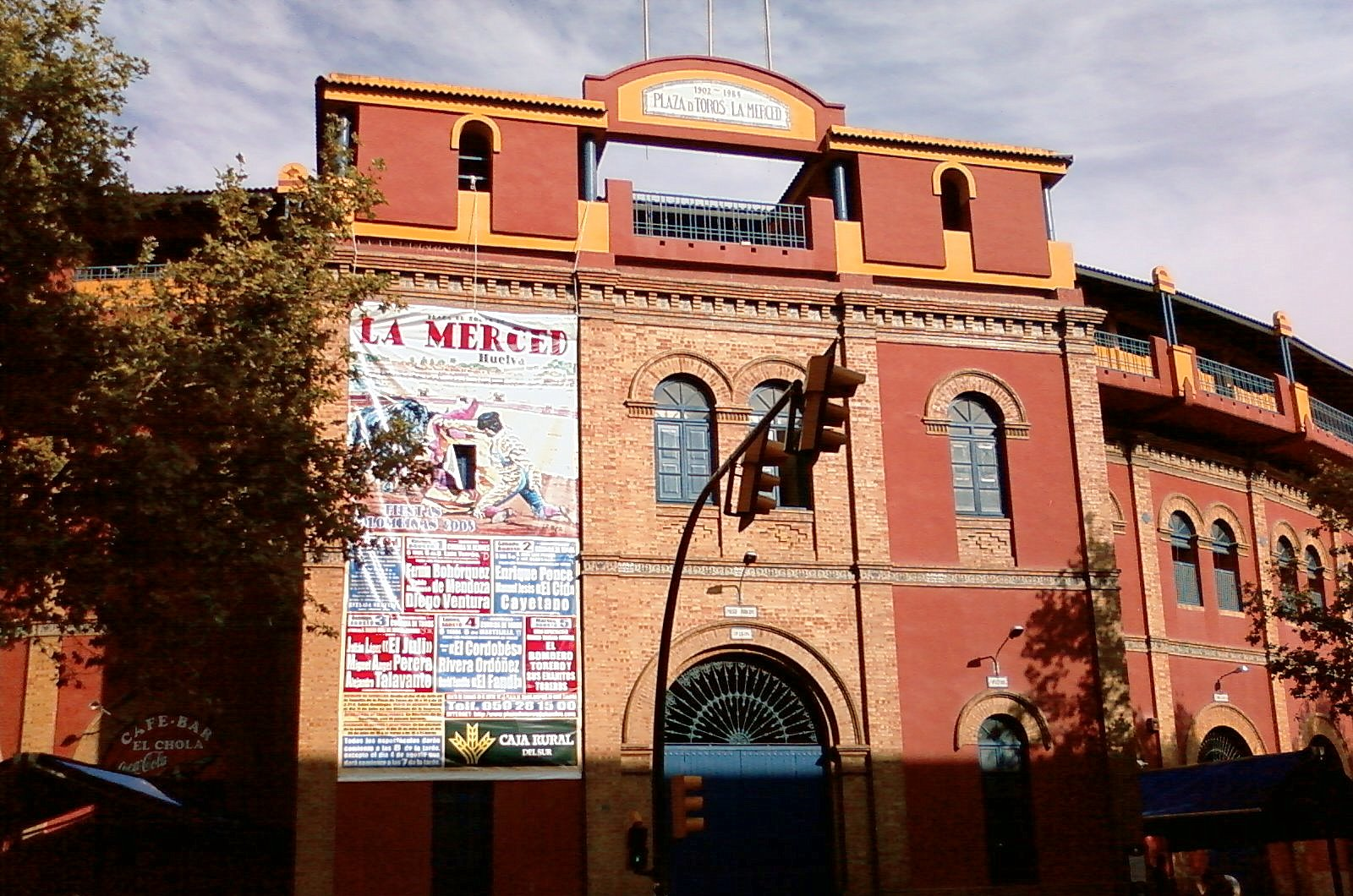
The plaza de toros is built on the sides of the Cabezo del Conquero a few meters from the Cathedral.

Bullfights at the Plaza de Toros de La Merced are part of the festivities. They constitute a parallel festival, and are probably the most successful aspect of the festivities. They begin several days before the festival proper, with an act of proclamation in the "León Ortega" School of Art in the El Matadero district.

== Particularities ==
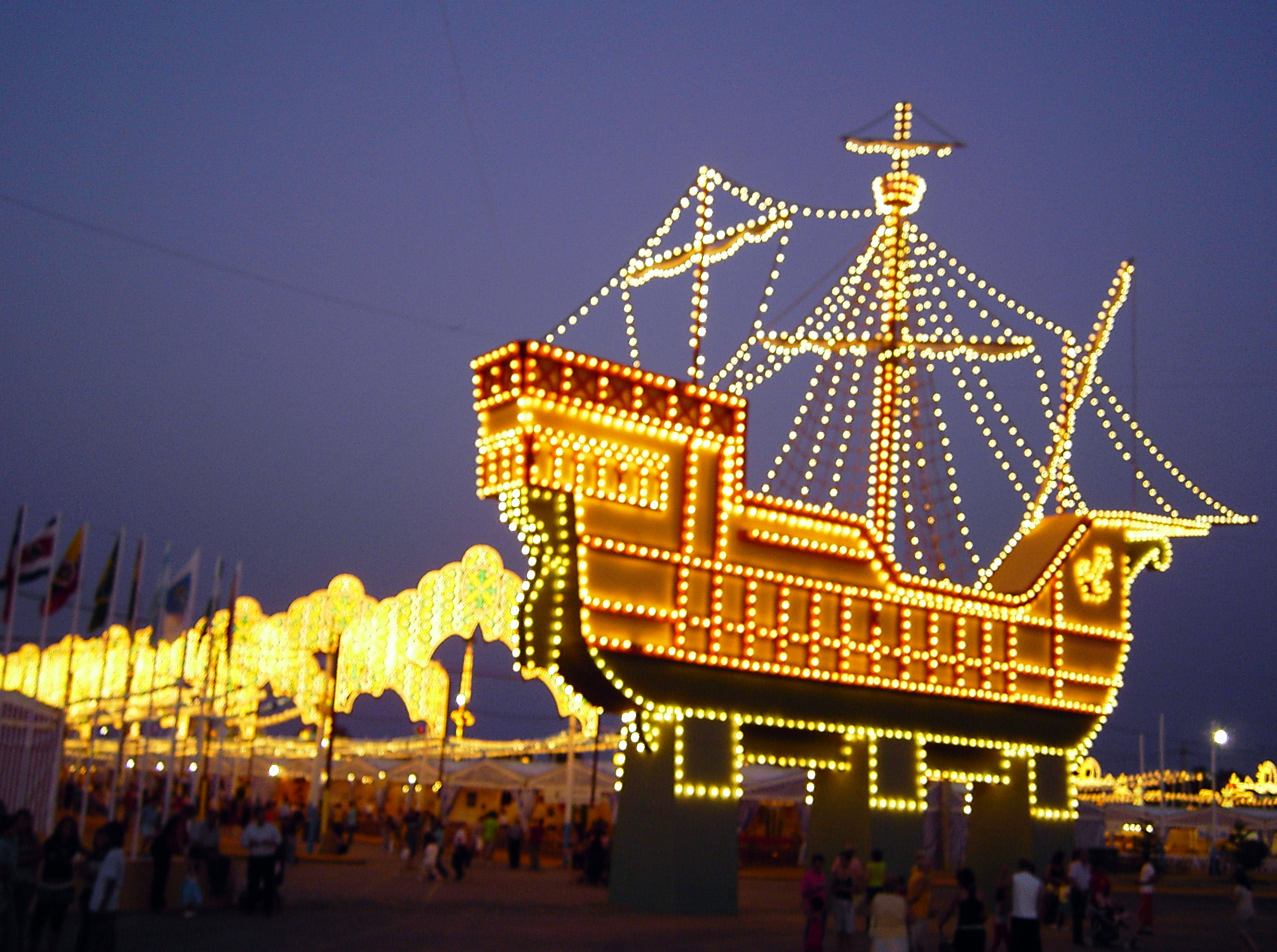
Entrance, 2007, representing the Santa María.

The Colombian Festivals, despite having an undoubtedly Andalusian style (and having become more like a typical Andalusian fair in the early 21st century), also has an Americanist aspect. Some of the booths may have music from various Latin American countries; others have more typically Andalusian music, for dances such as sevillanas, associated with flamenco, although unlike most Andalusian fairs it is not customary to attend the in traditional Andalusian dress.

The celebration are complemented by a series of cultural and sporting activities. "Música Junto a la Ría" ("Music along the estuary") is a series of concerts by groups from Huelva and elsewhere in Spain. There is also the Trofeo Colombino golf tournament and pétanque, archery, and handball competitions.

The festivities do retain a few nautical aspects: the Semana Náutica Colombina (Columbian Nautical Week), in collaboration with the Club Marítimo, as well as a fishing competition from an anchored dock and canoeing regattas.

The Trofeo Colombino football (soccer) tournament hosted by Recreativo de Huelva at the Estadio Nuevo Colombino was originally part of the Columbian Festivals, but is now held later in August.

== Gastronomy ==
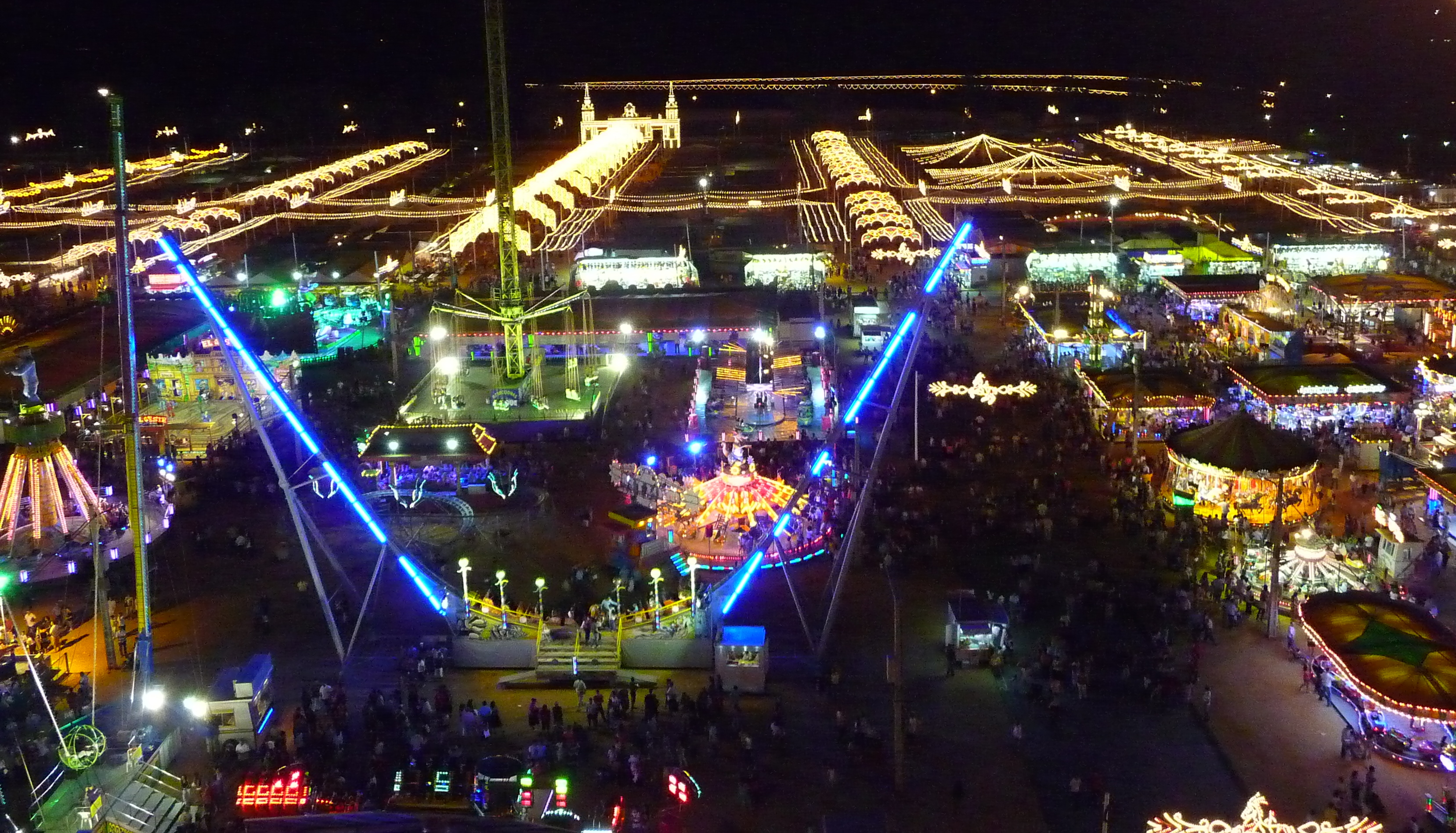
The fair district.

The food at the festivals provides a chance to sample the gastronomy of Huelva and of Andalucia in general. Among the foods served are fried seafood, featuring various species from the Gulf of Cádiz such as langostino, the "white prawn" (Parapenaeus longirostris), the coquina (Donax trunculus), and cuttlefish. Traditional meat dishes include pinchitos (skewers of marinated pork, cecina, and ham). Some booths are specialized in preparing the beverage known as "ponche colombino" ("Columbian punch"); a chamomile beverage (manzanilla) is also popular.
