= The Idol =

The Idol may refer to:

- The Idol (1923 film), a Polish drama film directed by Wiktor Biegański
- The Idol (1948 film), a French drama film directed by Alexander Esway
- The Idol (1952 film), an Argentine-Chilean thriller film directed by Pierre Chenal
- The Idol (1966 film), a British drama film directed by Daniel Petrie
- The iDol (2006 film), a Japanese science fiction film directed by Norman England
- The Idol (2015 film), a Palestinian drama film directed by Hany Abu-Assad
- The Idol (TV series), an American drama television series created by Sam Levinson, Abel Tesfaye, and Reza Fahim
- "The Idol", an episode of the television series Strange Experiences
- "The Idol", a song by W.A.S.P. from the 1992 album The Crimson Idol

== See also ==
- Idol (disambiguation)
