= Idol =

Idol or Idols may refer to:

- Idolatry, the worship of an idol as though it were a deity

== Arts and entertainment ==
- Teen idol, a celebrity with a large teenage fan base, such as:
  - Chinese idol
  - Japanese idol
    - Alternative idol
    - AV idol
    - Gravure idol
    - Junior idol
    - Net idol
  - Filipino idol
  - Korean idol
  - Taiwanese idol
- Matinée idol, a term used mainly to describe film or theatre stars who are adored to the point of adulation by their fans

=== Film ===
- Idols (1943 film), a Spanish romantic comedy film
- Idol (film), a 2019 South Korean thriller film
- Idols (2026 film), a 2026 sports action drama film

=== Music ===
- Idol Records, an American record label
- "Idol" (Amanda Ghost song), 2000
- "Idol" (BTS song), 2018
- "Idol" (Yoasobi song), 2023
- "I.D.O.L.", by NCT JNJM from Both Sides, 2026
- Idols (album), a 2025 album by Yungblud
- Idols (band), a Greek garage pop rock band

=== Television ===
- Idol (franchise), a British television franchise
  - American Idol
  - Arab Idol
  - Asian Idol
  - Australian Idol
  - Bangladeshi Idol
  - Cambodian Idol
  - Canadian Idol
  - Chinese Idol
  - Greek Idol
  - Hrvatski Idol
  - Idol (Norwegian TV series)
  - Idol (Polish TV series)
  - Idol (Serbian-Montenegrin and Macedonian TV series)
  - Idol (Swedish TV series)
  - Idol Philippines
  - Idol Puerto Rico
    - Idol Kids Puerto Rico
  - Idol stjörnuleit
  - Ídolos (Brazilian TV series)
  - Ídolos (Portuguese TV series)
  - Idols (Danish TV series)
  - Idols (Dutch TV series)
  - Idols (East African TV series)
  - Idols (Finnish TV series)
  - Idols (West African TV series)
  - Idols South Africa
  - Idool (TV series)
  - Indian Idol
    - Indian Idol (Hindi TV series)
    - Indian Idol Junior
    - Indian Idol Marathi
    - Telugu Indian Idol
  - Indonesian Idol
    - Indonesian Idol Junior
  - Kurd Idol
  - Latin American Idol
  - Macedonian Idol
  - Malaysian Idol
  - Maldivian Idol
  - Music Idol
  - Myanmar Idol
  - Nepal Idol
  - New Zealand Idol
  - Nigerian Idol
  - Nouvelle Star
  - Pakistan Idol
  - Pop Idol
  - Philippine Idol
  - Pinoy Idol
  - Singapore Idol
  - Vietnam Idol
  - World Idol
- 1DOL, a Philippine television series
- "Idol", an episode of the television series Power Rangers S.P.D.

=== Other uses in arts and entertainment ===
- The Idols, a professional wrestling tag team that wrestled for NWA All-Star Wrestling

== People ==
- Idol (surname)
- Lodi (wrestler), also known as Idol, American professional wrestler Bradley Cain (born 1970)
- Raffy Tulfo (born 1960), also known as "Idol", Filipino politician and broadcast journalist

== Other uses ==
- Idol (philosophy), a philosophical concept developed by Francis Bacon
- Illinois Department of Labor (IDOL), an American government agency
- MYLIP, also known as Inducible Degrader of the LDL receptor (IDOL), a human protein-coding gene
- Intelligent Data Operating Layer (IDOL), an Autonomy Corporation product

== See also ==
- Golden idol (disambiguation)
- Ideal (disambiguation)
- Idle (disambiguation)
- Idyl (disambiguation)
- The Idol (disambiguation)
- Idolization, an intense admiration or fixation on a person
- Idoli, a Serbian new wave band
- Zone of the Enders: 2167 Idolo, a Japanese original video animation
