= Idyl (disambiguation) =

Idyl or idyll may refer to:

- Idyll or idyl, a type of poem
- Lake Idyl, Winter Haven, Florida, USA; a lake
- Idyll Farms, Northport, Michigan, USA; a goat farm
- Idyl (musician), Nigerian singer Daniel Diongoli
- Idylls (album), 1992 album by Love Spirals Downwards
- Idyll (comics), name of two characters in Marvel Comics

== See also ==
- Idyll XI (bucolic poem #11) by Theocritus
- Idyll VI (bucolic poem #6) by Theocritus
- Idyllic school (The Idyllists), 19th century British art movement
- Ideal (disambiguation)
- Idol (disambiguation)
- Idle (disambiguation)
