= The Idler =

Idler refers to someone or something idle:

- An idle game
- A slacker, a person who habitually avoids work
- Idler-wheel, a system used to transmit the rotation of the main shaft of a motor to another rotating device
- Idler circuit, a circuit in a parametric amplifier to generate an idle response

Idler or The Idler may also refer to:

== Books and publications ==
- The Idler (1758–1760), series of essays by Samuel Johnson and his contemporaries
- The Idler (1892–1911), literary and humorous magazine started by Jerome K. Jerome
- The Idler (1993), bi-monthly British magazine exploring alternative ways of working and living
- The Idler (Canadian magazine), Canadian literary magazine published from 1985 to 1993
- The Idlers, 1906 novel by Morley Roberts

== Music ==
- Idlers (Canadian band), a Canadian reggae band
- The Idlers, a United States Coast Guard Academy ensemble

== Other uses ==
- The Idler (film), a 1914 American film adaptation of the play of the same name by C. Haddon Chambers
- Idler (yacht) American Yacht built in 1865 in Fairhaven, Connecticut
- An Idler, nom-de-plume of George Stillman Hillard (1808–1879)
- Salomon Idler (1610–1669), German shoemaker and aviation pioneer

== See also ==
- Idle (disambiguation)
