= English Bards and Scotch Reviewers =

1809 satirical poem penned by Lord Byron

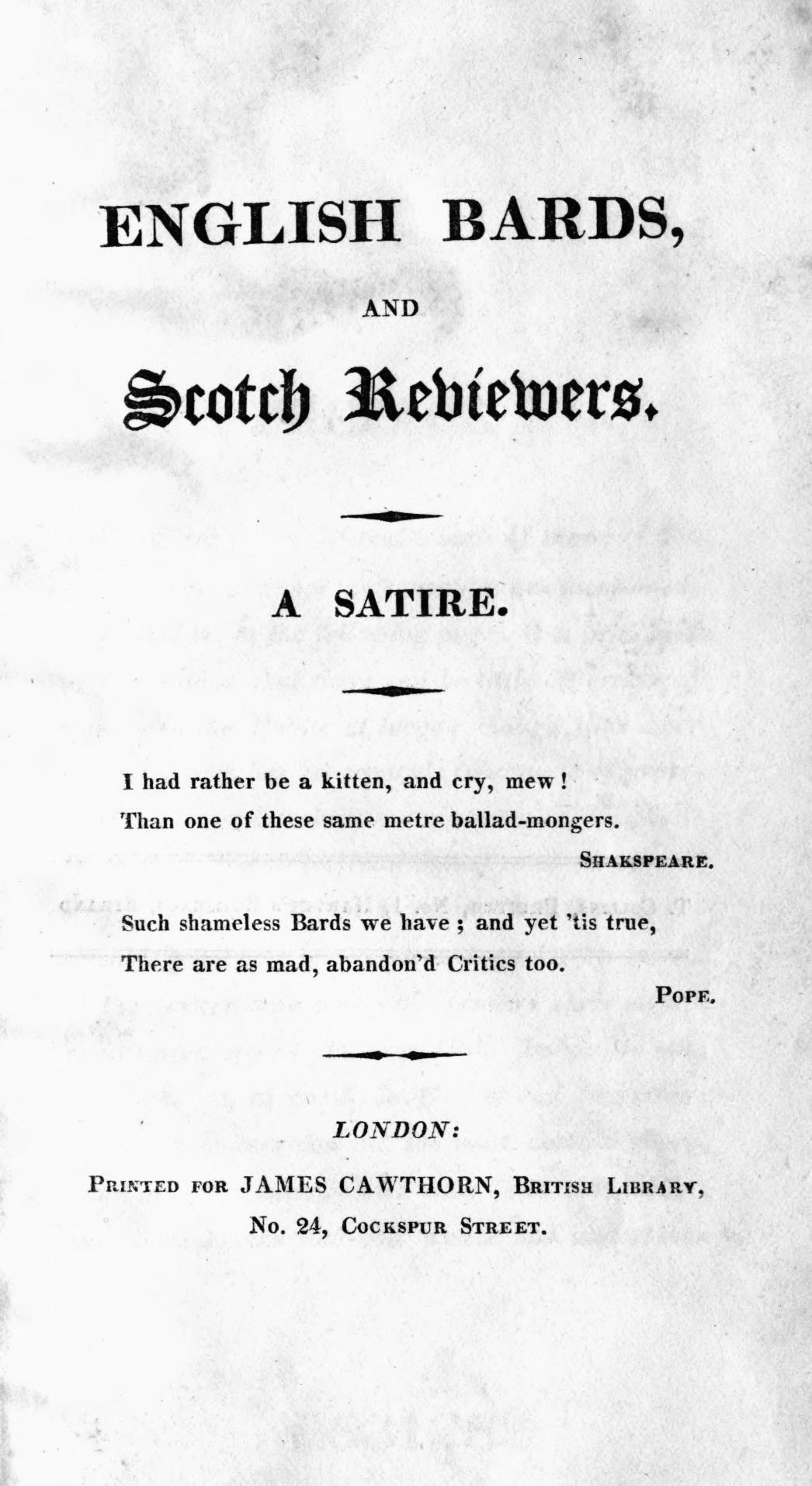
1809 first edition title page, James Cawthorn, London.

English Bards and Scotch Reviewers is an 1809 satirical poem written by Lord Byron, and published by James Cawthorn in London.

== Background and description ==
The poem was first published anonymously, in March 1809, and a second, expanded edition followed in 1809, with Byron identified as the author. The opening parodies the first satire of Juvenal.

Byron had published his first book of poetry, Hours of Idleness, in 1807. It received "strong censure" in a review by Henry Brougham, published anonymously in the Edinburgh Review.

Byron was already working on a poem called "British Bards", but the review, which he (incorrectly) attributed to Francis Jeffrey, prompted him to expand its scope; he made Jeffrey "the central figure in a wide-ranging satire on contemporary practices both in writing and in reviewing". In writing it, he drew on earlier satires, including the Baviad (1791) and Maeviad (1795) by William Gifford (1791), the texts published in the Anti-Jacobin (1797–1798), the Epics of the Ton (1807) by Lady Anne Hamilton and the Simpliciad (1808) by Richard Mant.

Byron used heroic couplets in imitation of Alexander Pope's The Dunciad to attack the reigning poets of Romanticism, including William Wordsworth and Samuel Taylor Coleridge, and Francis Jeffrey, the editor of the Edinburgh Review. He praised instead such Neoclassical poets as Pope and John Dryden. The poem went through several editions, but Byron finally suppressed the 5th edition in 1812 because he had come to regret his attitude toward those he had attacked.

== Sources ==
- Garrett, Martin: George Gordon, Lord Byron. (British Library Writers' Lives). London: British Library, 2000. ISBN 0-7123-4657-0.
- Garrett, Martin. Palgrave Literary Dictionary of Byron. Palgrave, 2010. ISBN 978-0-230-00897-7.
- Grosskurth, Phyllis: Byron: The Flawed Angel. Hodder, 1997. ISBN 0-340-60753-X.
