= Christopher Idle =

Christopher Idle may refer to:

- Christopher Idle (hymnwriter) (born 1938), British hymnwriter
- Christopher Idle (politician) (1771–1819), British politician and member of Parliament
