= Golden idol =

Golden idol may refer to:

- Golden Idol, a fictional artifact in the Indiana Jones franchise
- The Golden Idol, a 1954 American film
- Golden Idol, a video game series
  - The Case of the Golden Idol, a 2022 video game
  - The Rise of the Golden Idol, a 2024 video game
- Golden Idol, a fictional artifact in the amusement ride Volkanu: Quest for the Golden Idol

== See also ==
- Golden calf, a cult image made by the Israelites when Moses went up to Mount Sinai
