= Idle Hour, Lexington =

Idle Hour
- Neighborhood of Lexington, Kentucky
- Interactive map of Idle Hour
- Coordinates: 38.023°N 84.459°W
- Country: United States
- State: Kentucky
- County: Fayette
- City: Lexington

Area
  - Total: .220 sq mi (0.57 km^{2})
  - Water: 0 sq mi (0.0 km^{2})

Population (2000)
  - Total: 434
  - Density: 1,975/sq mi (763/km^{2})
- Time zone: UTC-5 (Eastern (EST))
  - Summer (DST): UTC-4 (EDT)
- ZIP code: 40502
- Area code: 859

Idle Hour is a neighborhood in southeastern Lexington, Kentucky, United States. Its boundaries are Idle Hour Country Club to the north, CSX railroad tracks to the east, New Circle Road to the south, and Richmond Road to the west.

== Neighborhood statistics ==
- Area: 0.361 square miles (0.93 km^{2})
- Population: 434
- Population density: 1,975 people per square mile
- Median household income: $31,792
