= Idol (surname) =

Idol is a surname. Notable people with the surname include:

- Aaron Idol (born 1980), Canadian wrestler
- Austin Idol (born 1949), American wrestler, born Michael McCord
- Billy Idol (born 1955), American pop singer, born Michael Broad
- John D. Idol (born 1958/1959), American businessman
- Ryan Idol (born 1964), American pornographic film actor, born Marc Donais
