= Hours of Idleness =

1807 title page.

Hours of Idleness was the first volume of poetry published by Lord Byron, in 1807, when he was 19 years old. It is a collection of mostly short poems, many in imitation of classic Roman poets.

== Background ==
The volume was published in June–July 1807 as a small octavo, printed and published by S. and J. Ridge of Newark in the UK and sold by the London booksellers: Crosby and Co.; Longman, Hurst, Rees, and Orme; F. and C. Rivington; and J, Mawman. The full title was Hours of Idleness; a Series of Poems Original and Translated, by George Gordon, Lord Byron, a Minor. It consisted of 187 pages with thirty-nine poems. Of these, nineteen came from the original Fugitive Pieces volume, while eight had first appeared in Poems on Various Occasions. Twelve were published for the first time. The "Fragment of a Translation from the 9th Book of Virgil's Aeneid" was included as "The Episode of Nisus and Euryalus, A Paraphrase from the Æneid, Lib. 9", made up of 406 lines.

After a scathing review in The Edinburgh Review in 1808, Byron responded by publishing, anonymously, his satiric poem English Bards and Scotch Reviewers in 1809.

Critic Henry Brougham, 1st Baron Brougham and Vaux wrote of the volume: "The poesy of this young lord belongs to the class which neither gods nor men are said to permit." He attacked the poems as "effusions ... spread over a dead flat" like "so much stagnant water" and accused Byron of being disingenuous, "pleading his minority" while seeming at the same time to say, "See how a minor can write!"

In a letter to John Cam Hobhouse, Byron wrote of his reaction: "As an author, I am cut to atoms by the E[dinburgh] Review, it is just out, and has completely demolished my little fabric of fame."

The original manuscript was in the collections of Wisbech & Fenland Museum, Isle of Ely.

== Sources ==
- Garrett, Martin: George Gordon, Lord Byron. (British Library Writers' Lives). London: British Library, 2000. ISBN 0-7123-4657-0.
- Garrett, Martin. Palgrave Literary Dictionary of Byron. Palgrave, 2010. ISBN 978-0-230-00897-7.
- Grosskurth, Phyllis: Byron: The Flawed Angel. Hodder, 1997. ISBN 0-340-60753-X.
