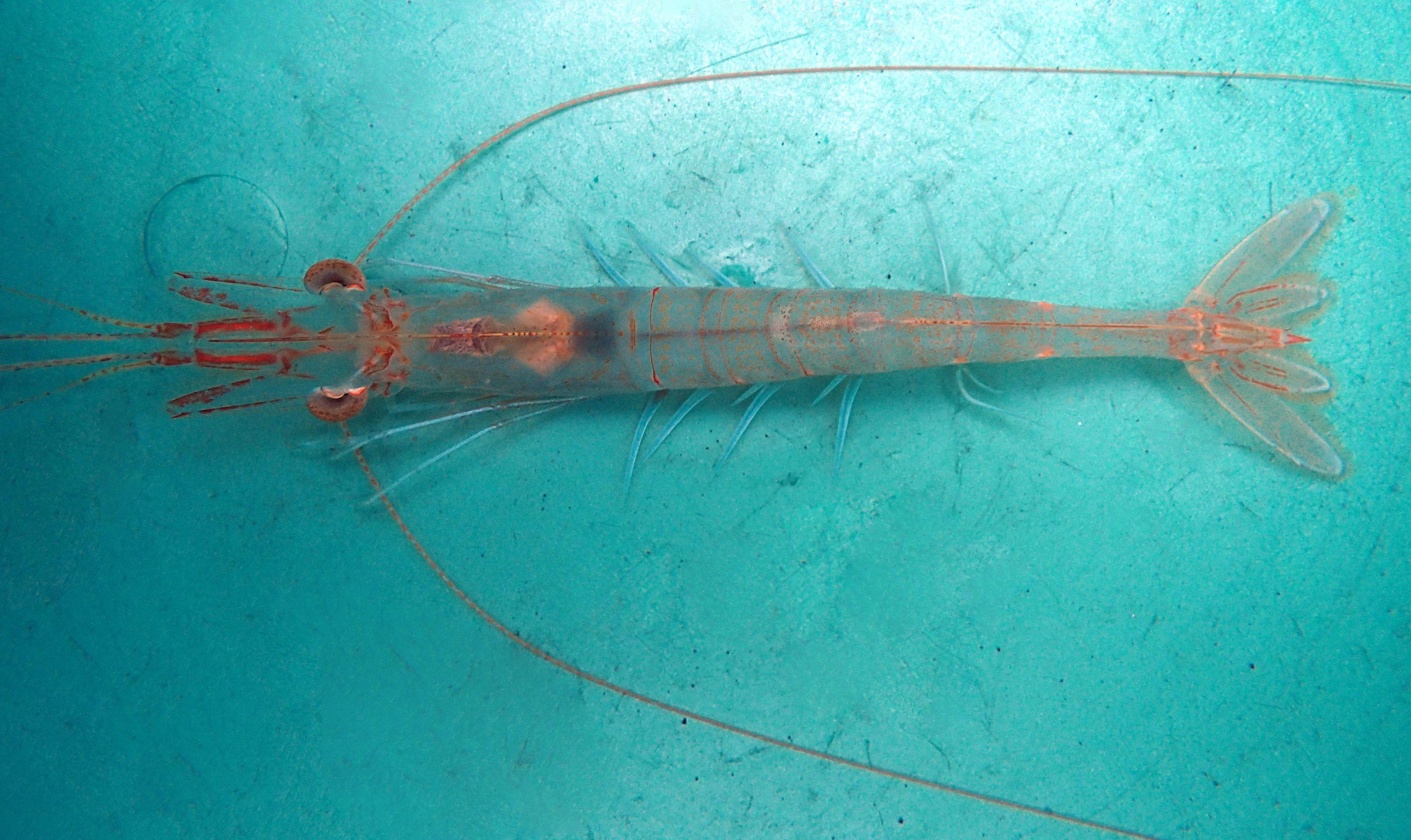
- Adult male specimen.

Scientific classification
- Kingdom: Animalia
- Phylum: Arthropoda
- Class: Malacostraca
- Order: Decapoda
- Suborder: Dendrobranchiata
- Family: Penaeidae
- Genus: Parapenaeus
- Species: P. longirostris

Binomial name
- Parapenaeus longirostris (Lucas, 1846)

= Parapenaeus longirostris =

Species of shrimp

Parapenaeus longirostris, the deep-water rose shrimp or deep-water pink shrimp, is a species of large decapod crustacean found in the Mediterranean Sea and the Atlantic Ocean. It lives on the sandy bottoms between depths of 20 to 700 meters, although it is most common between 70 and 400 m. Juveniles are found at around 100 meters, while larger specimens are almost always found in water deeper than 350 m.

P. longirostris feeds on a variety of prey including fish, crustaceans, polychaetes, bivalves, echinoderms and foraminifers.

The shrimp is an interest to fisheries, making it an important commercial species for trawlers in the Mediterranean.

== Description ==
There is a large furrow along the full length of the pink-orange carapace of the shrimp. Female gonads vary in colour, white to dark green, depending on the stage of maturity. P. longirostris grows up to 4.2 cm in length.
