= Idle Hours (painting) =

Painting by William Merritt Chase

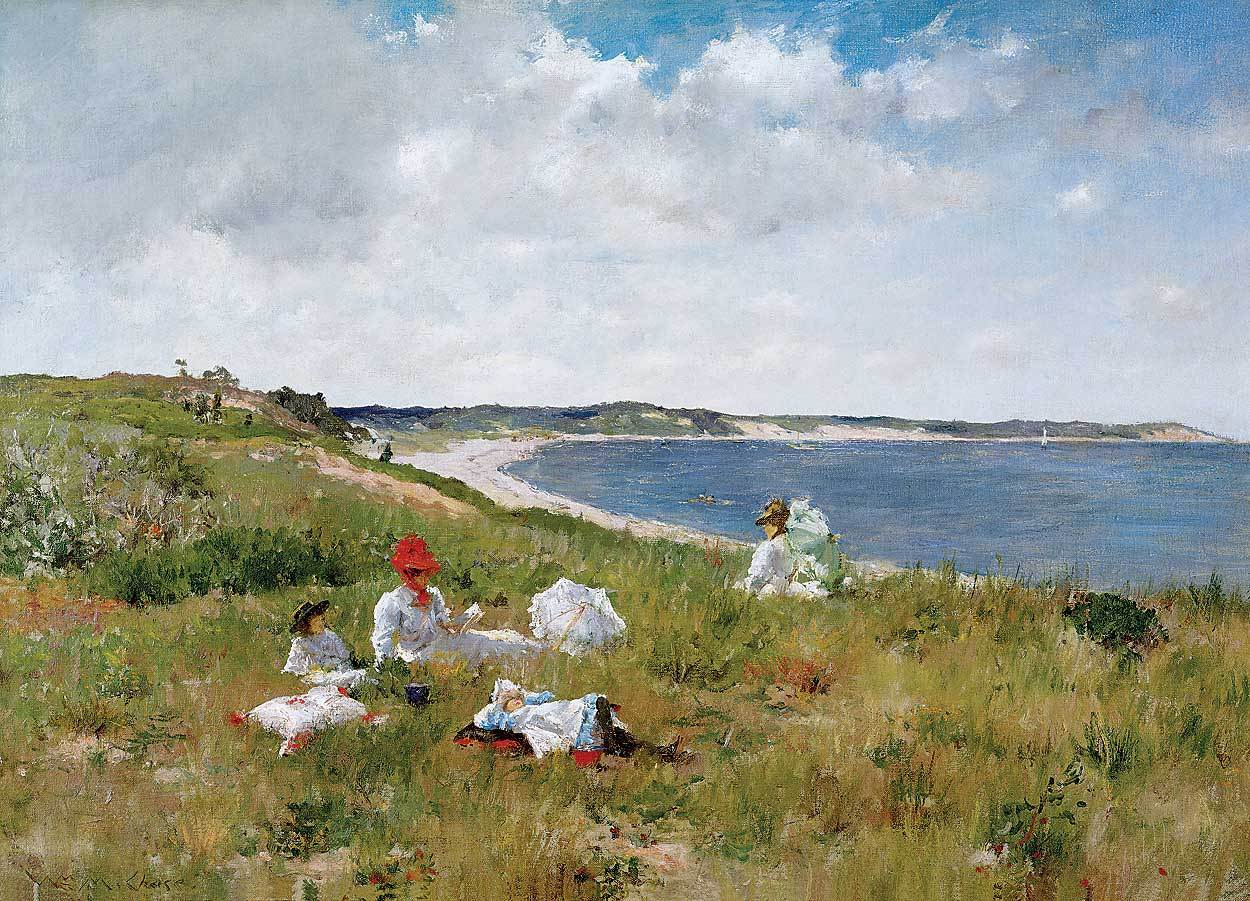
- Artist: William Merritt Chase
- Year: 1894
- Medium: Oil on canvas
- Dimensions: 90.2 cm × 64.8 cm (35.5 in × 25.5 in)
- Location: Amon Carter Museum of American Art, Fort Worth

Idle Hours is an oil-on-canvas landscape painting by the American Impressionist painter William Merritt Chase. Completed in 1894, it measures 90.2 by 64.8 centimeters, and is now housed at the Amon Carter Museum of American Art, Fort Worth. It is one of many paintings by Chase that depicted his wife and children at ease.

== Description ==
Idle Hours portrays Chase's wife, sister, and two daughters on the shore at eastern Long Island, where Chase taught a summer school in landscape painting. It depicts a country retreat from urbanization and industrialization.

== See also ==
- List of works by William Merritt Chase
