= History of ethical idealism =

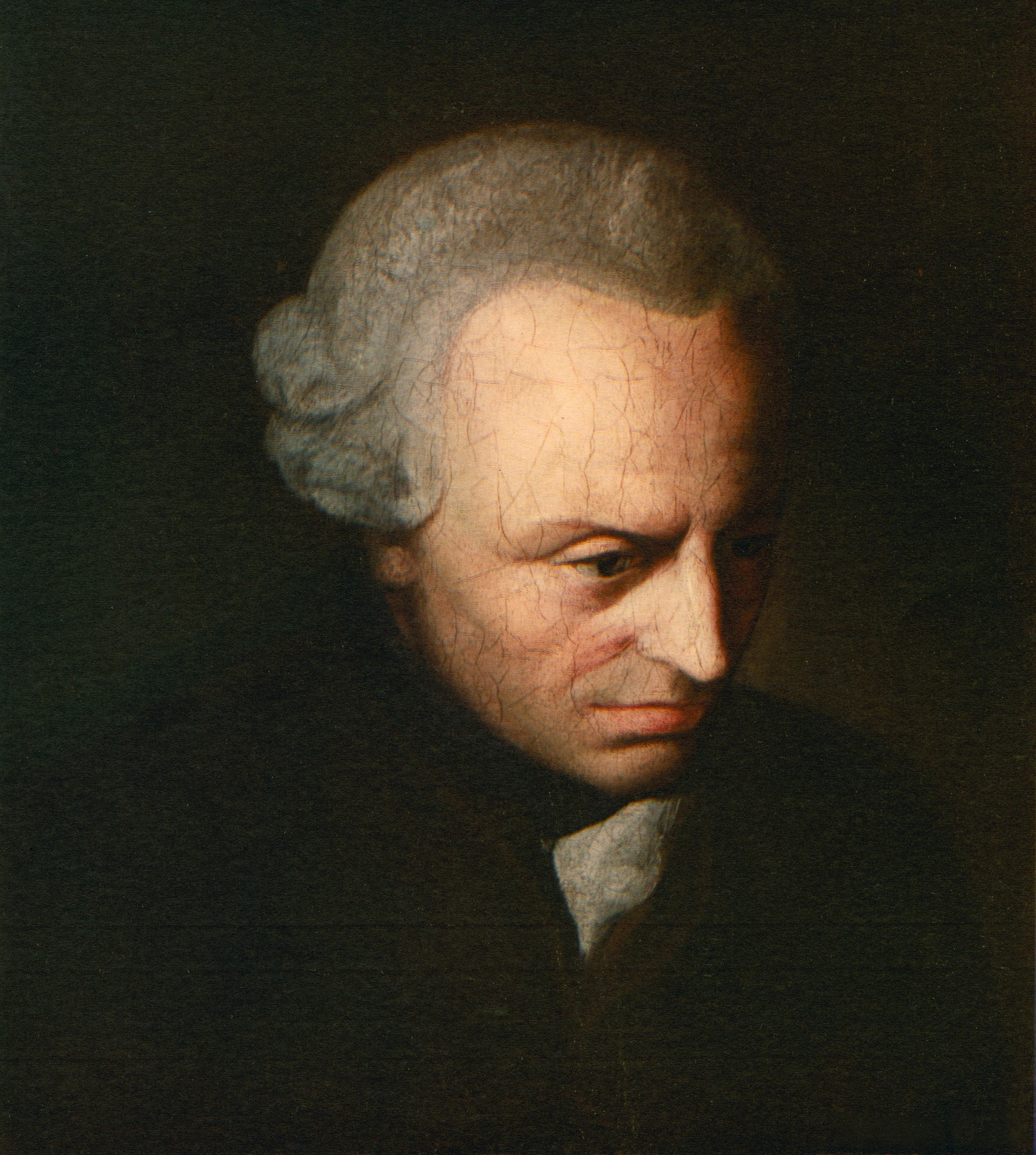
German philosopher Immanuel Kant's particular view of human nature and intellectual inquiry, later summed up as "Kantianism", articulated a theory of ethical idealism with respect to moral choice.

Ethical idealism, which is also referred to by terms such as moral idealism, principled idealism, and other expressions, is a philosophical framework based on holding onto specifically defined ideals in the context of facing various consequences to holding such principles and/or values. Such ideals, which are analyzed during the process of ethical thinking, become applied in practice via a group of specific goals relative to what has been learned over time about morality. As noted by philosopher Norbert Paulo, following ideals in a doctrinaire fashion will "exceed obligations" put on people such that actions "are warranted, but not strictly required."

With certain philosophical movements throughout history emphasizing various types of moral idealism, such as influences being a part of Christian ethics, Jewish ethics, and Platonist ethics, it relates to human decision making as differing alternatives get compared and contrasted. Advocates for ethical idealism, such as the philosopher Nicholas Rescher, have asserted that inherent mental concepts shared in terms of the human condition among multiple peoples have a real, tangible nature due to their influences turning logical thinking into action, particularly by stimulating peoples' sense of motivation. In contrast, skeptical philosophers, such as Richard Rorty, have argued that the complex course of recorded history has shown that "to do the right thing is largely a matter of luck" and particularly is due to "being born in a certain place and a certain time."

Debates and discussions held on not just ethical idealism specifically but on the general difficulty of defining goodness versus evilness in an intellectual fashion has become a "great divide in contemporary philosophy".

== Definitions and general background ==
A range of different philosophical movements throughout history have emphasized moral idealism, with this including the doctrine influencing Christian ethics, Jewish ethics, and Platonist ethics. This has occurred in the context of an underlying argument about morality in which, as one scholar has put it, certain thinkers have postulated "an underlying sense of right and wrong that is common to all human beings at all times and places". Ongoing debates on whether or not these kinds of inherent mental concepts truly exist have been called a "great divide in contemporary philosophy".

A framework in the mind based on holding onto specifically defined ideals weighs them in the context of facing various consequences to holding such principles and/or values. An ideal placed under intellectual analysis become applied in practice via a group of specific goals relative to what has been learned over time about moral thinking. As noted by Austrian philosopher Norbert Paulo, following ideals in a doctrinaire fashion will "exceed obligations" put on people such that actions "are warranted, but not strictly required."

American scholar Nicholas Rescher has stated that metaphysics comes into play when analyzing such a philosophical viewpoint about human thinking given that nature of ideals gives them a particular status as "useful fictions", with this developing in terms of their special existence relative to the broader concept of ethical choice. He has described a worldview coming into focus via logical thinking based on moral idealism that he has defined in depth, remarking that "it [is] rational to strive for the unattainable" and that a "practicality" exists in "seriously pursuing impossible dreams." He interpreted the human condition shared among multiple groups as tied together in a real, tangible fashion due to their mutual influences that've resulted from idealistic ethics, particularly by such ideas stimulating peoples' sense of motivation.

Writing in his book Ethical Idealism: An Inquiry Into the Nature and Function of Ideals, Rescher specifically argued,

"The 'reality' of an ideal lies not in its substantive realization in some separate domain but in its formative impetus upon human thought and action in this imperfect world. The object at issue with an ideal does not, and cannot, exist as such. What does, however, exist is the idea of such an object. Existing, as it must, in thought alone (in the manner appropriate to ideas), it exerts a powerful[ly] organizing and motivating force on our thinking, providing at once a standard of appraisal and [also] a stimulus to action."

Other thinkers have asserted that ideals as such constitute things that ought to be said to exist in the real world, having a substance partly to the same extent as human beings and similarly material-based entities. A prominent example of this philosophical take is the ancient Greek intellectual figure of Plato. To him, ideals represented self-contained objects existing in their own domain that humanity discovered through reason rather than invented out of whole cloth for narrow benefit. Thus, while existing in relation to the human mind, ideals still possessed a certain kind of metaphysical independence according to Plato. Labeled later on as an ethical idealist, given his large legacy, Plato saw these applied moral views as significantly influential on one's life course.

With respect to how exactly human reason should work, American philosopher Ralph Barton Perry defined idealistic morality as being the result of a particular attitude about the act of attaining knowledge itself, writing in his book The Moral Economy,

"Moral idealism means to interpret life consistently with ethical, scientific, and metaphysical truth. It endeavors to justify the maximum of hope, without compromising or confusing any enlightenment judgement of truth. In this it is, I think, not only consistent with the spirit of a liberal and rational age but also with the primary motive of religion. There can be no religion... without an open and candid mind as well as an indomitable purpose."

In a keynote speech given in August 2005, American scholar Richard Rorty remarked upon morally idealistic philosophy in the context of strictly specified principles through the lens of his views on applied ethics, asserting to a group of business professionals,

"[I]ndividuals become aware of more alternatives, and therefore wiser, as they grow older. The human race as a whole has become wiser as history has moved along. The source of these new alternatives is the human imagination. It is the ability to come up with new ideas, rather than the ability to get in touch with unchanging essences, that is the engine of moral progress."

Rorty has argued that the complex course of recorded history has shown that "to do the right thing is largely a matter of luck", with standards of morality being far from broadly universal and instead coming fundamentally from "being born in a certain place and a certain time." He has highlighted the disconnect between intellectual abilities and other elements related to personal character, noting for instance the clarity of vision and rhetorical skill used by historical actors such as those inside of Nazi Germany. In Rorty's opinion, humanity as a whole has advanced at an ethical level due to gradual progress via both technological change and social advancement, which reflects efforts at improving civilization itself.

== Historical evolution of moral idealism ==
German philosopher Immanuel Kant's particular view of human nature and intellectual inquiry, later summed up as "Kantianism", stressed the inherent power of logical thinking in terms of moral analysis. Kant's advocacy for the "categorical imperative", a doctrine through which every individual choice has to be made with the consideration of the decider that it ought to be a universally held maxim, took place in the broader context of his metaphysical views. In Kant's writings, defiance of higher principles was not only wrong in a practical sense but in a fundamentally rational and thus moral sense as well.

All of that has resulted in Kant's intellectual framework being described as a philosophy of moral idealism by later scholars such as Nicholas Rescher. The latter thinker wrote that at a fundamental level Kant had understood that expressing an ideal meant applying "a regulative principle of reason" that commands one's mind to thus use logical thinking in painting a mental landscape "as if certain 'idealized' conditions could be realized". As a matter of working out intellectual concepts, Kant asserted the notion that "ought" implies "can", which as an argument has long attracted controversy and debate among philosophers.

Works authored by Kant on these overall subjects include the initial publication The Groundwork of the Metaphysics of Morals followed by The Critique of Practical Reason, The Metaphysics of Morals, Anthropology from a Pragmatic Point of View, Religion within the Boundaries of Mere Reason, with those latter commentaries developing the intellectual figure's thinking. Within the pages of Anthropology from a Pragmatic Point of View in particular, the philosopher articulated a vision of people as by their very essence driven by meaningful ethics. Through the lens of Kant's doctrine, no ironclad divide has existed between morality and the natural world, with empirical analysis of human psychology dovetailing with studies of people's ideals.

The philosopher's metaphysics tied closely with his socio-political views and belief in fundamental advancement, such that Kant wrote inside of the pages of the Critique of Pure Reason in detail,

"What the highest level might be at which humanity may have to come to rest, and how great a gulf may still be left between the idea [of perfection] and its realization, are questions which no one can, or ought to answer. For the matter depends upon freedom; and it is in the very nature of freedom to pass beyond any and every specified limit."

Evaluating Kant's method of turning ideal-based standards into a broader ethical framework in context, scholar Frederick P. Van De Pitte has written about the primacy of rationality to the philosopher, with Pitte remarking,

"Kant realized that man's rational capacity alone is not sufficient to constitute his dignity and elevate him above the brutes. If reason only enables him to do for himself what instinct does for the animal, then it would indicate for man no higher aim or destiny than that of the brute but only a different way of attaining the same end. However, reason is man's most essential attribute because it is the means by which a truly distinctive dimension is made possible for him. Reason, that is, reflective awareness, makes it possible to distinguish between good and bad, and thus morality can be made the ruling purpose of life. Because man can consider an array of possibilities, and which among them is the most desirable, he can strive to make himself and his world into a realization of his ideals."

== See also ==
- Applied psychology
- Idealism in international relations
  - Democratic peace theory
  - Liberal international relations theory
- Index of ethics articles
  - Applied ethics
  - Belief
  - Critical thinking
  - Good and evil
  - Justice
  - Morality
  - Philosophical value
  - Principle
  - Virtue
- Kantian ethics
- Legacy of Plato's philosophy
- Personal character
  - Compassion
  - Courage
  - Empathy
  - Determination
  - Faith
  - Forgiveness
  - Generosity
  - Psychological foresight
  - Respect
- Philosophy of life
- Relativist morality
- Optimism
