= Feria Valencia =

Building in Benimàmet, Spain

- Interactive map of Feria Valencia
- Address: Av. de les Fires, s/n, Pobles de l'Oest, 46035; Valencia; Spain
- Coordinates: 39°30′14.83″N 0°25′31.76″W

Construction
- Opened: 1917

Website
- Venue Website

International Sample Fair of Valencia or, as a trademark, Feria Valencia is the oldest institution organizing fair events in Spain, its year of foundation being in 1917. Recently remodeled and expanded, the work of architect José María Tomás Llavador, It constitutes one of the most important within the European circuit.

== History ==
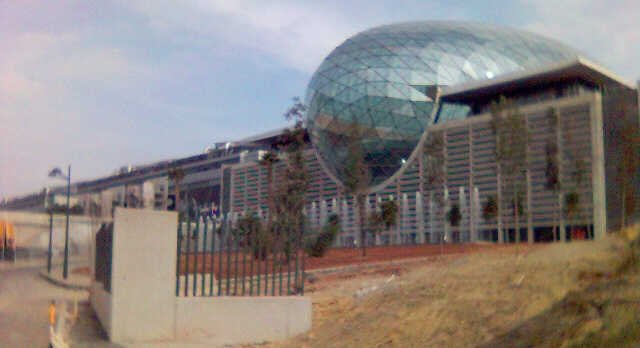
Exterior view of the Feria.

Feria Valencia is the oldest institution dedicated to the organization of trade fairs in Spain. Founded in 1917, it has completed almost 100 years of activity. Its statutes recognize the law of March 26, 1943, which gave it the status of "Official Institution." in addition to granting it the duopoly of international fairs, along with Barcelona. This shared duopoly was kept in place until 1979. In 2003, Feria Valencia's first experience as an organizer of events abroad took place, with the celebration of Mexico Ferias del Niño.

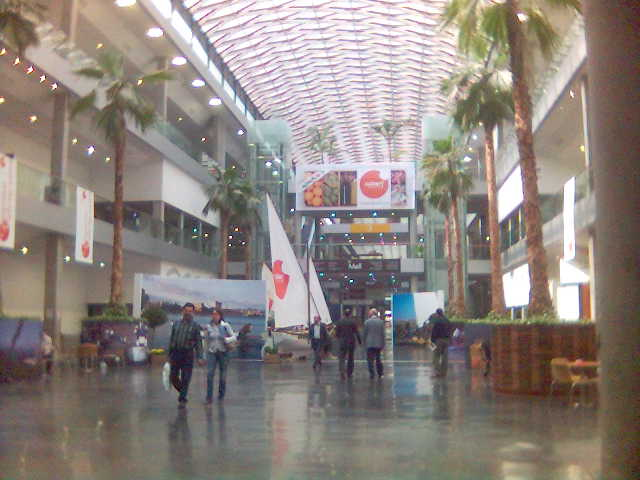
Central hallway.

== Structure ==
The main function of the Fair is to facilitate trade between companies. This institution has expanded its activities to various fields, such as holding conferences. It is an institution specialized in professional events and that serves many industrial sectors in the Spanish economy, such as furniture, lighting or ceramics, the energy sector or food, but does not neglect other fields of activity. in the service sector, such as franchising, training, tourism.

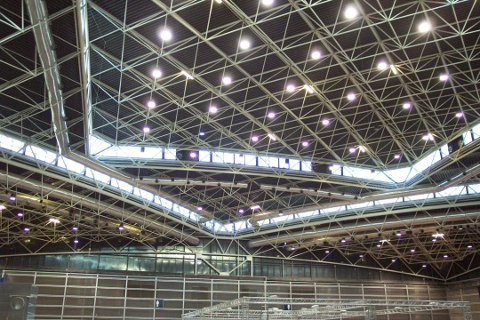
Feria Valencia.

Feria Valencia is a non-profit institution, as stated in its own statutes. Its reason for being is to support economic sectors and the impact of its activity on the environment, both in terms of the turnover that exhibitors obtain from their relationship with Feria Valencia, and what they earn from the services. associated with the fair activity itself (hospitality, assembly, hotels, tourism, transport, leisure, services).

It is the first Spanish Fair that has been certified by AENOR with the ISO 9002 standard, currently ISO 9001/2000. It also has the QAFE certification, from the Association of Spanish Fairs, and the SICTED quality commitment diploma, Tourism Quality System in Destination.

The economic impact of Feria Valencia on its surroundings is estimated at 700 to 800 million euros annually.

In 2023 the Feria held the World Rhythmic Gymnastics Championships. After the October 2024 Spain floods, it was temporarily converted as a morgue.

== Location ==
It is located in the district of Benimámet, which belongs to the capital Valencia. Located five kilometers from the urban center of Valencia, the exhibition center is connected to the national highway network of Spain through the ring road to the city. The highway connects you with the port of Valencia, and with the city airport.

== Management team ==
- Enrique Soto - General director

== See also ==
- Sample fair
