= Idols (1943 film) =

- Directed by: Florián Rey
- Written by: Manuel Beca; Fernando Roldán
- Starring: Conchita Montenegro; Ismael Merlo; Manuel Arbó
- Cinematography: Theodore J. Pahle
- Edited by: Jacques Saint-Léonard
- Music by: José Ruiz de Azagra
- Production company: CIFESA
- Distributed by: CIFESA
- Release date: 7 October 1943
- Running time: 82 minutes
- Country: Spain
- Language: Spanish

Idols (Spanish: Ídolos) is a 1943 Spanish romantic comedy film directed by Florián Rey and starring Conchita Montenegro and Ismael Merlo. A French actress meets a Spanish bullfighter. It was made by CIFESA, Spain's largest film studio at the time.

== Cast ==
- Ismael Merlo as Juan Luis Gallardo
- Conchita Montenegro as Clara Bell
- Manuel Arbó as Leblanc
- María Brú as Jeanette
- Juan Calvo as Empresario
- Casimiro Hurtado as Salomón
- Mary Lamar as Lily Garay
- Gracia de Triana as Cantaora
- Ramón Martori as Paul Reymond
- Luis Latorre
- Francisco Marimón

== Bibliography ==
- Bentley, Bernard. A Companion to Spanish Cinema. Boydell & Brewer 2008.
