= Ideal (ethics) =

Principle or value that one actively pursues as an ethical goal

An ideal is a principle or value that one actively pursues as a goal, usually in the context of ethics, and one's prioritization of ideals can serve to indicate the extent of one's dedication to each. The belief in ideals is called ethical idealism, and the history of ethical idealism includes a variety of philosophers.

In some theories of applied ethics, such as that of Rushworth Kidder, there is importance given to such orders as a way to resolve disputes. In law, for instance, a judge is sometimes called on to resolve the balance between the ideal of truth, which would advise hearing out all evidence, and the ideal of fairness. Given the complexity of putting ideals into practice, and resolving conflicts between them, it is not uncommon to see them reduced to dogma. One way to avoid this, according to Bernard Crick, is to have ideals that themselves are descriptive of a process, rather than an outcome. His political virtues try to raise the practical habits useful in resolving disputes into ideals of their own. A virtue, in general, is an ideal that one can make a habit.

In his Law of Peoples, philosopher John Rawls describes an "ideal" conception of the foreign relations obligations of states as one based on Jean-Jacques Rousseau's conception of a social contract, taking "men as they are and laws as they might be" as his starting point. The ideal conception establishes laws which people will follow. The "nonideal" concept adapts the ideal to the fact that people do not always follow the laws.

== See also ==
- Dominant culture
- Euthyphro dilemma
- History of ethical idealism
- Self-sufficiency
- Social justice
