= SKEW =

Stock market index measuring tail risk

SKEW is the ticker symbol for the CBOE Skew Index, a measure of the perceived tail risk of the distribution of S&P 500 investment returns over a 30-day horizon. The index values are calculated and published by the Chicago Board Options Exchange (CBOE) based on current S&P 500 options market data.

SKEW is similar to the VIX index, but instead of measuring implied volatility based on a normal distribution, it measures an implied risk of future returns realizing outlier behavior. The index model defines an outlier as two or more standard deviations below the mean, which would characterize a black swan event or market crash. The index value typically reflects the trading activity of portfolio managers hedging tail risk with options, to protect portfolios from a large, sudden decline in the market. A SKEW value of 100 indicates the options market perceives a low risk of outlier returns; values increasing above 100 reflect an increased perception of risk for future outlier event(s).

== See also ==
- Skewness risk
- Taleb distribution
- Volatility skew
