= Tail risk =

Risk of statistically extreme events

Tail risk, sometimes called "fat tail risk", is the financial risk of an asset or portfolio of assets moving more than three standard deviations from its current price, above the risk of a normal distribution. Tail risks include low-probability events arising at both ends of a normal distribution curve, also known as tail events. However, as investors are generally more concerned with unexpected losses rather than gains, the debate about tail risk is focused on the left tail. Prudent asset managers are typically cautious with the tail involving losses which could damage or ruin portfolios, and not the beneficial tail of outsized gains.

The common technique of theorizing a normal distribution of price changes underestimates tail risk when market data exhibit fat tails, thus understating asset prices, stock returns and subsequent risk management strategies.

Tail risk is sometimes defined less strictly: as merely the risk (or probability) of rare events. The arbitrary definition of the tail region as beyond three standard deviations may also be broadened, such as the SKEW index which uses the larger tail region starting at two standard deviations.

Although tail risk cannot be eliminated, its impact can be somewhat mitigated by a robust diversification across assets, strategies, and the use of an asymmetric hedge.

== Characteristics ==
Traditional portfolio strategies rely heavily upon the assumption that market returns follow a normal distribution, characterized by the bell curve, which illustrates that, given enough observations, all values in a sample will be distributed symmetrically with respect to the mean. The empirical rule then states that about 99.7% of all variations following a normal distribution lies within three standard deviations of the mean. Therefore, there is only a 0.3% chance of an extreme event occurring. Many financial models such as modern portfolio theory and efficient markets assume normality.

However, financial markets are not perfect as they are largely shaped by unpredictable human behavior and an abundance of evidence suggests that the distribution of returns is in fact not normal, but skewed. Observed tails are fatter than traditionally predicted, indicating a significantly higher probability that an investment will move beyond three standard deviations. This happens when a rare, unpredictable, and very important event occurs, resulting in significant fluctuations in the value of the stock. Tail risk is then the chance of a loss occurring due to such events. These tail events are often referred to as black swan events and they can produce disastrous effects on the returns of the portfolio in a very short span of time. Fat tails suggest that the likelihood of such events is in fact greater than the one predicted by traditional strategies, which subsequently tend to understate volatility and risk of the asset.

The importance of considering tail risk in portfolio management is not only theoretical. McRandal and Rozanov (2012) observe that in the period from the late 1980s to the early 2010s, there were at least seven episodes that can be viewed as tail events: equity market crash of 1987, 1994 bond market crisis, 1997 Asian financial crisis, 1998 Russian financial crisis and the Long-Term Capital Management blow-up, dot-com bubble collapse, subprime mortgage crisis, and infamous bankruptcy of Lehman Brothers.

== Measures ==
Tail risk is very difficult to measure as tail events happen infrequently and with various impact. The most popular tail risk measures include conditional value-at-risk (CVaR) and value-at-risk (VaR). These measures are used both in finance and insurance industries, which tend to be highly volatile, as well as in highly reliable, safety-critical uncertain environments with heavy-tailed underlying probability distributions.

== Tail risk hedging ==
=== Role of the 2008 financial crisis ===
The 2008 financial crisis and the Great Recession, which had a dramatic material impact on investment portfolios, led to a significant increase in awareness of tail risks. Even highly sophisticated institutions such as American university endowments, long-established sovereign wealth funds, and highly experienced public pension plans, suffered large double digit percentage drops in value during the Great Recession. According to McRandal and Rozanov (2012), losses of many broadly diversified, multi-asset class portfolios ranged anywhere from 20% to 30% in the course of just a few months.

=== Defining tail risk ===
If one is to implement an effective tail risk hedging program, one has to begin by carefully defining tail risk, i.e. by identifying elements of a tail event that investors are hedging against. A true tail event should exhibit the following three properties simultaneously with significant magnitude and speed: falling asset prices, increasing risk premia, and increasing correlations between asset classes.

However, these statistical characteristics can be validated only after the event, and so hedging against these events is a rather challenging, though vital, task for providing the stability of a portfolio whose aim is to meet its long-term risk/return objectives.

=== Actively managed tail hedge strategies ===
Active tail risk managers with an appropriate expertise, including practical experience applying macroeconomic forecasting and quantitative modeling techniques across asset markets, are needed to devise effective tail risk hedging strategies in the complex markets. First, possible epicenters of tail events and their repercussions are identified. This is referred to as idea generation. Second, the actual process of constructing the hedge takes place. Finally, an active tail hedge manager guarantees constant effectiveness of the optimal protection by an active trading of positions and risk levels still offering significant convexity. When all these steps are combined, alpha, i.e. an investment strategy’s ability to beat the market, can be generated using several different angles.

As a result, active management minimizes 'negative carry' (a condition in which the cost of holding an investment or security exceeds the income earned while holding it) and provides sufficient ongoing security and a truly convex payoff delivered in tail events. Furthermore, it manages to mitigate counterparty risk, which is particularly relevant in case of tail events.

== See also ==
- Black swan theory
- Global catastrophic risk
- Kolmogorov's zero–one law which is also known as a Tail event.
- Risk measure
- Tail risk parity
- Taleb distribution
- Value at risk
