= Tail risk parity =

Tail risk parity is an extension of the risk parity concept that takes into account the behavior of the portfolio components during tail risk events. The goal of the tail risk parity approach is to protect investment portfolios at the times of economic crises and reduce the cost of such protection during normal market conditions. In the tail risk parity framework risk is defined as expected tail loss. The tail risk parity concept is similar to drawdown parity

== Approach ==
Traditional portfolio diversification relies on the correlations among assets and among asset classes, but these correlations are not constant. Because correlations among assets and asset classes increase during tail risk events and can go to 100%, TRP divides asset classes into buckets that behave differently under market stress conditions, while assets in each bucket behave similarly. During tail risk events asset prices can fall significantly creating deep portfolio drawdowns. Asset classes in each tail risk bucket fall simultaneously during tail risk events and diversification of capital within buckets does not work because periods of negative performance of portfolio components are overlapped. Diversification across tail risk buckets can provide benefits in the form of smaller portfolio drawdowns and reduce the need for tail risk protection.

== Higher moments ==
Some researchers propose an extension of the classical risk parity portfolio optimization approach which incorporates higher moments such as skewness and kurtosis. These higher moment risk parity methods tend to outperform classical risk parity approaches significantly when the underlying data exhibits high non-normality and co-dependencies, but may provide less value-add in other datasets. Simulation studies confirm the value of higher moment methods increases with degree of non-normality and correlation in the data.

== See also ==
- Financial risk
- Financial risk management § Investment management
- Financial economics § Portfolio theory
- Hedge fund
- Risk parity
- Holy grail distribution
- Black swan theory
