= Dagum =

Dagum is a surname. Notable people with the surname include:

- Camilo Dagum, probability theorist, namesake of the Dagum distribution in probability theory
- Estelle Bee Dagum, Argentine and Canadian economic statistician
- Paul Dagum, researcher who first developed dynamic Bayesian networks

== See also ==
- Bayog, Zamboanga del Sur, a municipality in the Philippines that includes the barangay of Dagum as one of its subdivisions
