= Wild card (foresight) =

In a view of the future, a wild card is a low-probability, large-effect event. This concept may be introduced into anticipatory decision-making activity in order to increase the ability of organizations and governments to adapt to surprises arising in turbulent (business) environments. Such sudden and unique incidents might constitute turning points in the evolution of a certain trend or system. Wild cards may or may not be announced by weak signals, which are incomplete and fragmented data from which foresight information might be inferred.

== Description ==
The concept of wild cards was first defined in 1992 by the Copenhagen Institute for Futures Studies, together with BIPE Conseil and the Institute for the Future, as “future developments or events with a relatively low probability of occurrence but a likely high impact.” John L. Petersen later popularized the term globally in his book Out of the Blue – Wild Cards and Other Big Future Surprises (1997/1999). . Petersen's book articulates a series of events that due to their likelihood to surprise and potential for effect might be considered 'Wildcards'.".

Building on Petersen's work, futurist Marcus Barber developed an additional wild card tool called a "Reference Impact Grid" (RIG) in 2004 which helps strategists and risk managers define vulnerabilities within a given system and to then consider what type of event might destabilize that system. Challenging Petersen's hypothesis, his additional thoughts on cascading discontinuity sets' broke away from idea that wild cards are always a singular one off event, to introduce the idea that a series of interrelated events might also achieve a similar outcome to the big one-off event. A cascading discontinuity set can achieve a similar outcome to a one off wild card via a series of smaller, unplanned events that eventually come together to overwhelm the system's ability to cope. Like the big wild card, the end result is the same – the system no longer has the resources available to it to continue functioning and is overwhelmed.

The concept of wild cards comes close to the black swan theory described by Nassim Nicholas Taleb in his 2007 book The Black Swan. Black swans however can be seen as events that somehow are written in destiny (or the stars) and will occur anyhow.

The title refers to the "black swans" that existed already for millions of years in Australia but became only known to non-Aboriginal Australians only when they sailed there. Nicholas stresses therefore the surprising side and unpredictability of the black swan as well as their certainty (or unavoidability).

Another concept that comes close to the concept of wild cards and black swans is the tipping point of Malcolm Gladwell's The Tipping Point, which actually is a special form of a wild card that realizes itself by accumulation within a system that reveals itself in a drastic change of the system.

Some authors plea for a better understanding of the nature of events that people share under the concepts as wild cards, black swans, breakthroughs and so on. Victor van Rij uses the concept of wild card and sees these as events which shake but also shape the future he distinguishes between "human caused" events where the "good" and "bad will" of actors is involved (like the fall of the Berlin wall, or 9–11), where the surprise is more or less subjective, and nature caused events (like tsunamis, large volcanic eruptions, asteroid impact) where destiny plays a larger role, where people by using their knowledge may influence the effect of the event or even the occurrence of the event itself by influencing its development. Making it worthwhile to develop early warning systems and to take precautionary measures. He also distinguishes between imaginary wild cards and the really occurring ones. These imaginary wild cards may have the same effect as really occurring wild cards and may be used to influence decision makers and the public opinion either by informing them on real threats or opportunities that may appear in future or by falsifying these. Early warning signals for human caused wild cards should be looked for in Human communication and psychology as well as historical science.

Angela and Karlheinz Steinmüller use wild card imagination to enhance the resilience of enterprises by evoking out of the box thinking on positive and negative wild cards and creativity in handling these. They see wild cards as earth quakes of the human mind, opening up new possibilities in thinking.
