= Black swan theory =

Theory of response to surprise events

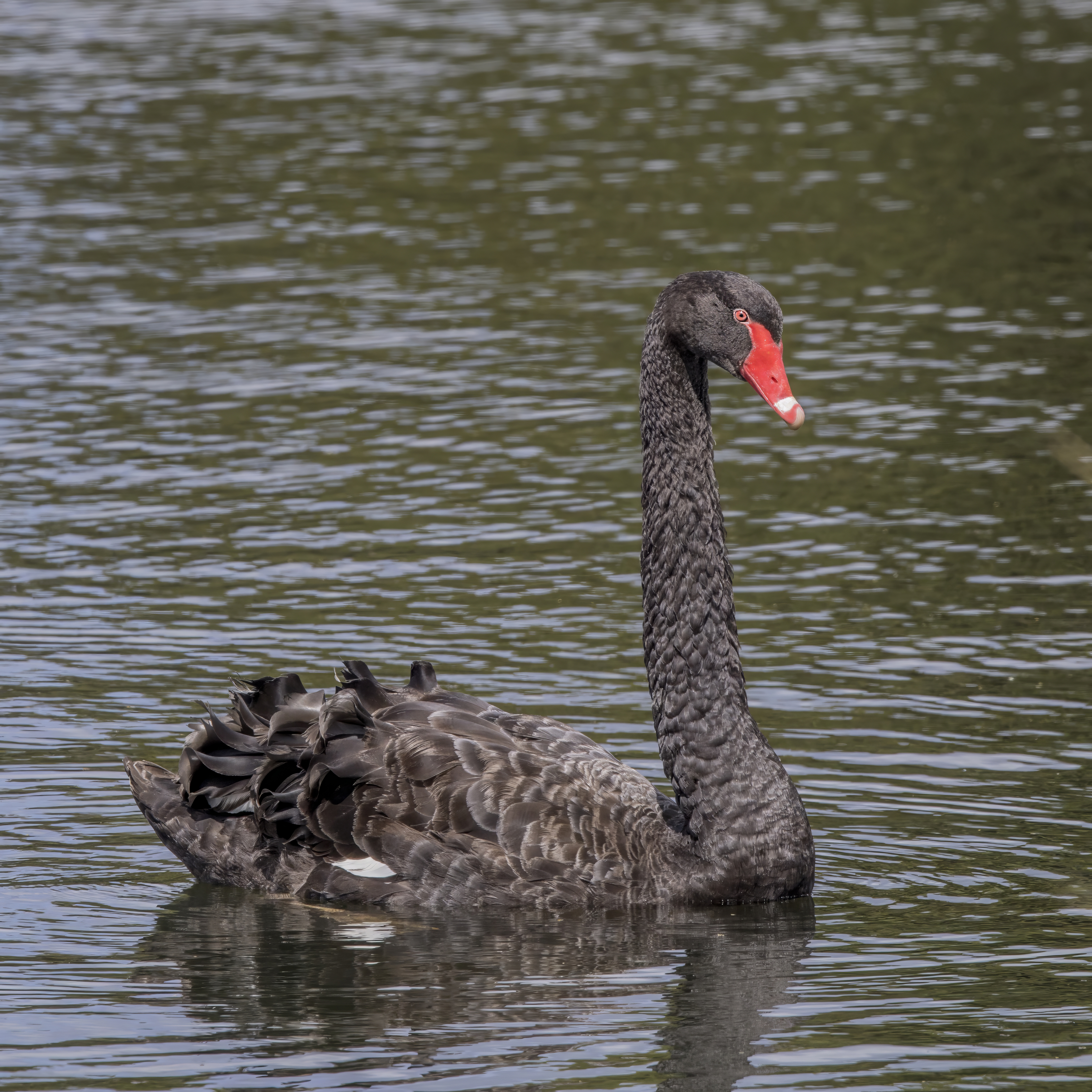
A black swan (Cygnus atratus) in Tasmania, Australia

The black swan theory or theory of black swan events is a metaphor that describes an event that comes as a surprise, has a major effect, and is often inappropriately rationalized after the fact with the benefit of hindsight. The term arose from a Latin expression which was based on the presumption that black swans did not exist. The expression was used in the original manner until around 1697 when Dutch mariners saw black swans living in Australia. After this, the term was reinterpreted to mean an unforeseen and consequential event.

The reinterpreted theory was articulated by Nassim Nicholas Taleb, starting in 2001, to explain:

1. The disproportionate role of high-profile, hard-to-predict, and rare events that are beyond the realm of normal expectations in history, science, economics, and technology.
2. The non-computability of the probability of consequential rare events using scientific methods (owing to the very nature of small probabilities).
3. The individual and collective psychological biases that make people blind to uncertainty, and to the significant role of rare events in historical affairs.

In his 2010 book, Taleb defines the term as an event with two characteristics: first, it is so rare and outside the realm of expectations that it is unpredictable; second, its consequences are extreme—either beneficial or catastrophic—though usually only the catastrophic Black Swan events attract attention. Definitionally, Taleb considers black swans to be in the eye of the beholder and warns that objectively defining a black swan in a way "invariant in the eyes of all observers" would be erroneous. Taleb provides the example of the 9/11 attacks, which were a black swan for many, but not for its planners and perpetrators.

Taleb's "black swan theory" (which differs from the earlier philosophical versions of the problem) refers only to statistically unexpected events of large magnitude and consequence and their dominant role in history. Such events, considered extreme outliers, collectively play vastly larger roles than regular occurrences. More technically, in the scientific monograph "Silent Risk", Taleb mathematically defines the black swan problem as "stemming from the use of degenerate metaprobability".

== Background ==
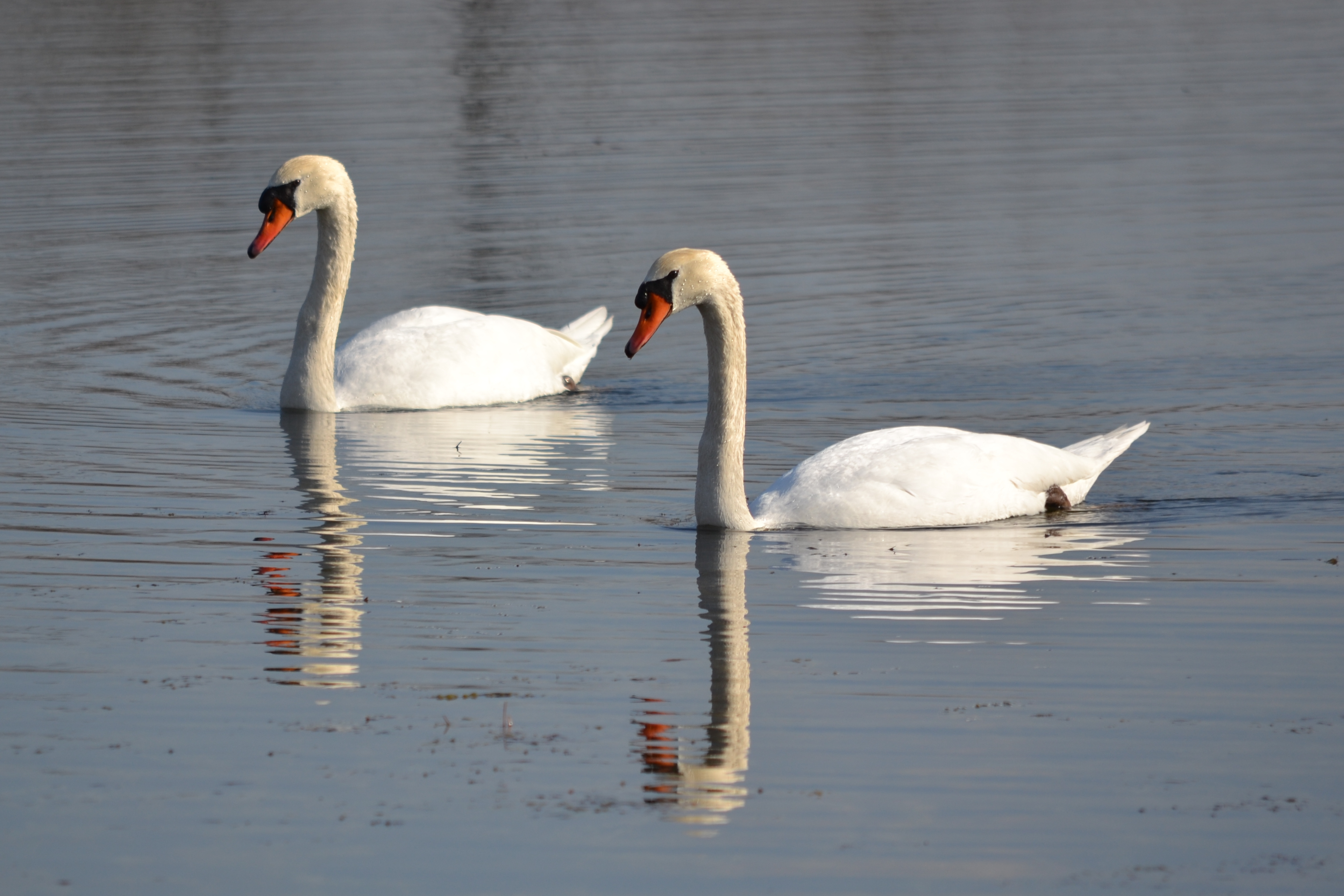
Two white mute swans (Cygnus olor) in Italy

The phrase "black swan" derives from a Latin expression; its oldest known occurrence is from the 2nd-century Roman poet Juvenal's characterization in his Satire VI of something being "rara avis in terris nigroque simillima cygno" ("a bird as rare upon the earth as a black swan"). When the phrase was coined, the black swan was presumed by Romans not to exist. The English phrase "rare bird", meaning an odd or exotic person, is derived from the same line of Juvenal.

Juvenal's phrase was a common expression in 16th century London as a statement of impossibility. The London expression derives from the Old World presumption that all swans must be white because all historical records of swans reported that they had white feathers. In that context, a black swan was impossible or at least nonexistent.

However, in 1697, Dutch explorers led by Willem de Vlamingh became the first Europeans to see black swans, in Western Australia. The term subsequently metamorphosed to connote the idea that a perceived impossibility might later be disproved. Taleb notes that in the 19th century, John Stuart Mill used the black swan logical fallacy as a new term to identify falsification. Black swan events were discussed by Taleb in his 2001 book Fooled By Randomness, which concerned financial events. His 2007 book The Black Swan extended the metaphor to events outside financial markets. Taleb regards almost all major scientific discoveries, historical events, and artistic accomplishments as "black swans"—undirected and unpredicted. He gives the rise of the Internet, the personal computer, World War I, the dissolution of the Soviet Union, and the 9/11 attacks as examples of black swan events.

Taleb asserts:

What we call here a Black Swan (and capitalize it) is an event with the following three attributes.

First, it is an outlier, as it lies outside the realm of regular expectations, because nothing in the past can convincingly point to its possibility. Second, it carries an extreme 'impact'. Third, in spite of its outlier status, human nature makes us concoct explanations for its occurrence after the fact, making it explainable and predictable.

I stop and summarize the triplet: rarity, extreme 'impact', and retrospective (though not prospective) predictability. A small number of Black Swans explains almost everything in our world, from the success of ideas and religions, to the dynamics of historical events, to elements of our own personal lives.

Taleb defines the term "black swan" within a broader terminological framework consisting of not only black, but also "grey swans", "white swans" and "ducks". In a May 2025 working paper published by the Federal Reserve, Daniel J. Barth and Stacey Schreft put forth the following diagnostic tool to categorize them:

Categories
	Black Swan	Grey Swan	White Swan	Duck
Official Sector Intervention	Legislative Interest	Targeted interventions	Minimal intervention, adjusting rules implementing laws and closing enforcement gaps	No intervention
News Coverage	Near 24/7 pervasive across media outlets for an extended period; includes deep dives and documentaries	Extensive coverage across many outlets of “big event, reminiscent of the last time” for shorter period; fewer “deep dives”	Brief coverage, likely the most significant of the month, perhaps the quarter, but not the year	Lead segment for a week or so
Cross Jurisdictional Coordination	Major new agreements and initiatives from interagency and international public sector organisations, including creation of entirely new bodies	New but targeted adjustments to interagency and international agreements and initiatives	Limited adjustment of existing interagency agreements and implementation	None
Private Sector Adaptation	Reorganisation of industries; birth of new subindustries; new risk management practices/structures	Introducing new and adapting existing products and services to better hedge newly salient risks	Updating of practices but generally business as usual. Reallocation of risks at the margin.	Business as usual
Legislative Interest	New and far-reaching legislation	Legislation to address deficiencies in or changes that came about in the aftermath of earlier legislation	Interest, but no new legislation. Outreach to public sector agencies to ensure that oversight and enforcement adapt	Little to no interest; perfunctory hearings

== Identifying ==
Based on the author's criteria:

1. The event is a surprise (to the observer).
2. The event has a major effect.
3. After the first recorded instance of the event, it is rationalized by hindsight, as if it could have been expected; that is, the relevant data were available but unaccounted for in risk mitigation programs. The same is true for the personal perception by individuals.

Ahmad, Kutan, and Gupta (2021), Halliburton (2020), and Winston (2020) consider the COVID-19 pandemic to be a black swan. Ghosh (2020) and van den Heiligenberg (2020) label it a "grey swan,” defined as an event without historical precedent, highly unlikely but conceivable. Taleb (2020) calls it a "white swan", defined as something with great impact that will occur with great certainty.

According to Taleb, the pandemic was not a black swan, as it was expected with great certainty that a global pandemic would eventually take place. Instead, it is considered a white swan—such an event has a major effect, but is compatible with statistical properties.

== Coping with black swans ==
The practical aim of Taleb's book is not to attempt to predict events which are unpredictable, but to build robustness against negative events while still exploiting positive events. Taleb contends that banks and trading firms are very vulnerable to hazardous black swan events and are exposed to unpredictable losses. On the subject of business, and quantitative finance in particular, Taleb critiques the widespread use of the normal distribution model employed in financial engineering, calling it a Great Intellectual Fraud. Taleb elaborates the robustness concept as a central topic of his later book, Antifragile: Things That Gain From Disorder.

In the second edition of The Black Swan, Taleb provides "Ten Principles for a Black-Swan-Robust Society".

Taleb states that a black swan event depends on the observer. For example, what may be a Black Swan surprise for a turkey is not a Black Swan surprise to its butcher; hence the objective should be to "avoid being the turkey" by identifying areas of vulnerability to "turn the Black Swans white".

== Epistemological approach ==
Taleb claims that his black swan is different from the earlier philosophical versions of the problem, specifically in epistemology (as associated with David Hume, John Stuart Mill, Karl Popper, and others), as it concerns a phenomenon with specific statistical properties which he calls, "the fourth quadrant".

Taleb's problem is about epistemic limitations in some parts of the areas covered in decision making. These limitations are twofold: philosophical (mathematical) and empirical (human-known) epistemic biases. The philosophical problem is about the decrease in knowledge when it comes to rare events because these are not visible in past samples and therefore require a strong a priori (extrapolating) theory; accordingly, predictions of events depend more and more on theories when their probability is small. In the "fourth quadrant", knowledge is uncertain and consequences are large, requiring more robustness.

According to Taleb, thinkers who came before him who dealt with the notion of the improbable (such as Hume, Mill, and Popper) focused on the problem of induction in logic, specifically, that of drawing general conclusions from specific observations. The central and unique attribute of Taleb's black swan event is that it is high-impact. His claim is that almost all consequential events in history come from the unexpected – yet humans later convince themselves that these events are explainable in hindsight.

One problem, labeled the ludic fallacy by Taleb, is the belief that the unstructured randomness found in life resembles the structured randomness found in games. This stems from the assumption that the unexpected may be predicted by extrapolating from variations in statistics based on past observations, especially when these statistics are presumed to represent samples from a normal distribution. These concerns often are highly relevant in financial markets, where major players sometimes assume normal distributions when using value at risk models, although market returns typically have fat tail distributions.

Taleb said:

I don't particularly care about the usual. If you want to get an idea of a friend's temperament, ethics, and personal elegance, you need to look at him under the tests of severe circumstances, not under the regular rosy glow of daily life. Can you assess the danger a criminal poses by examining only what he does on an ordinary day? Can we understand health without considering wild diseases and epidemics? Indeed the normal is often irrelevant. Almost everything in social life is produced by rare but consequential shocks and jumps; all the while almost everything studied about social life focuses on the 'normal,' particularly with 'bell curve' methods of inference that tell you close to nothing. Why? Because the bell curve ignores large deviations, cannot handle them, yet makes us confident that we have tamed uncertainty. Its nickname in this book is GIF, Great Intellectual Fraud.

More generally, decision theory, which is based on a fixed universe or a model of possible outcomes, ignores and minimizes the effect of events that are "outside the model". For instance, a simple model of daily stock market returns may include extreme moves such as Black Monday (1987), but might not model the breakdown of markets following the September 11, 2001 attacks. Consequently, the New York Stock Exchange and Nasdaq exchange remained closed till September 17, 2001, the most protracted shutdown since the Great Depression. A fixed model considers the "known unknowns", but ignores the "unknown unknowns", made famous by a statement of Donald Rumsfeld. The term "unknown unknowns" appeared in a 1982 New Yorker article on the aerospace industry, which cites the example of metal fatigue, the cause of crashes in Comet airliners in the 1950s.

Deterministic chaotic dynamics reproducing the Black Swan Event have been researched in economics. That is in agreement with Taleb's comment regarding some distributions which are not usable with precision, but which are more descriptive, such as the fractal, power law, or scalable distributions and that awareness of these might help to temper expectations. Beyond this, Taleb emphasizes that many events simply are without precedent, undercutting the basis of this type of reasoning altogether.

Taleb also argues for the use of counterfactual reasoning when considering risk.

== See also ==
- Bad beat – Term in poker
- Butterfly effect – Idea that small causes can have large effects
- Currency crisis – Type of financial crisis
- Dark horse – Previously less known thing becoming prominent
- Deus ex machina – Device to resolve the plot of a dramatic work
- Domino effect – Cumulative effect produced when one event sets off a chain of other events
- Dragon king theory – Event that is both extremely large in effect and of unique origins
- Extreme risk – Low-probability risk of very bad outcomes
- Falsifiability – Property of a statement that can be logically contradicted
- The Gray Rhino: How to Recognize and Act on the Obvious Dangers We Ignore – Book by Michele Wucker published 2016
- Grey swan
- Global catastrophic risk – Hypothetical global-scale disaster risk
- Hindsight bias – Type of confirmation bias
- Holy grail distribution – Probability distribution with a positive mean and a right fat tail
- Kurtosis risk – Term in decision theory
- List of cognitive biases
- Long tail – Feature of some statistical distributions
- Miracle – Event not explicable by natural or scientific laws
- Normal Accidents – 1984 book by Charles Perrow
- Normalcy bias – Disbelief or minimization in response to threat warnings
- Outside Context Problem – 1996 Book by Iain M. Banks
- Perfect storm – Phrase
- Quasi-empiricism in mathematics
- Rare events – Events unlikely to occur
- Reasonably foreseeable – Failure to exercise reasonable care
- Subjective probability
- Tail risk – Risk of statistically extreme events
- Taleb distribution – Type of probability distribution in economics
- Technological singularity – Hypothetical event
- Uncertainty – Situations involving imperfect or unknown information
- Wild card (foresight)

== Bibliography ==
- Taleb, Nassim Nicholas (2010) [2007], The Black Swan: The Impact of the Highly Improbable (2nd ed.), London: Penguin, ISBN 978-0-14103459-1.
- Taleb, Nassim Nicholas (September 2008), "The Fourth Quadrant: A Map of the Limits of Statistics", Third Culture, The Edge Foundation.
- The U.S. response to NEOs- avoiding a black swan event
