= Holy grail distribution =

Probability distribution with a positive mean and a right fat tail

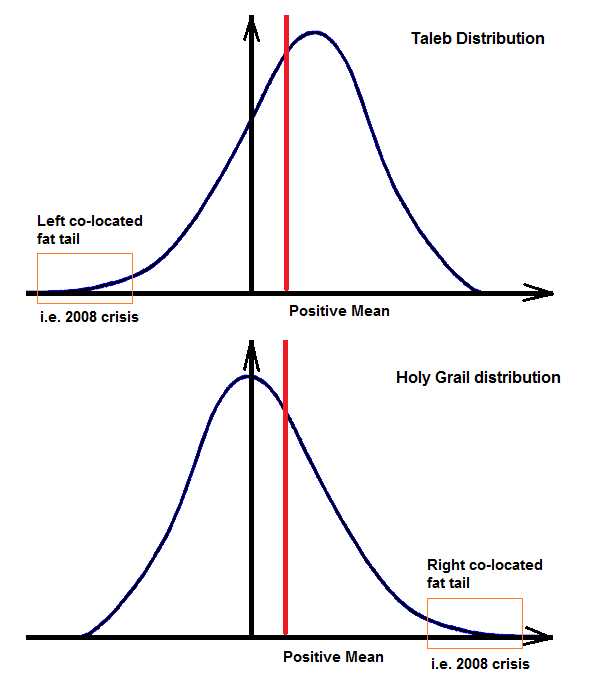
Taleb distributions and Holy grail distribution

In economics and finance, a holy grail distribution is a probability distribution with positive mean and right fat tail — a returns profile of a hypothetical investment vehicle that produces small returns centered on zero and occasionally exhibits outsized positive returns.

The distribution of historical returns of most asset classes and investment managers is negatively skewed and exhibits fat left tail (abnormal negative returns). Asset classes tend to have strong negative returns when stock market crises take place. For example, in October 2008 stocks, most hedge funds, real estate and corporate bonds suffered strong downward price corrections. At the same time vehicles following the Holy Grail distribution such as the US dollar (as a DXY index), treasury bonds and certain hedge fund strategies that bought credit default swaps (CDS) and other derivative instruments had strong positive returns. Market forces that pushed the first category of assets down pulled the latter category up.

Protection of a diversified investment portfolio from market crashes (extreme events) can be achieved by using a tail risk parity approach, allocating a piece of the portfolio to a tail risk protection strategy, or to a strategy with Holy grail distribution of returns.

A financial instrument or investment strategy that follows a Holy Grail distribution is a perfect hedge to an instrument that follows the Taleb distribution if outliers occur at the same time in both distributions, as when a "Taleb" investment vehicle suffers an unusual loss, the Holy Grail distribution exhibits a strong return compensating for that loss.

Practitioners tend to distinguish between a Holy Grail distribution and investment returns that are generated from an inverted Taleb distribution, a “minus-Taleb” distribution. The return series of the former has a positive mean while returns from the latter have a negative mean. For example, maintaining protection from market crashes by maintaining an exposure to an out-of-the-money put option on a market index follows a “minus-Taleb” distribution because options premiums have to be paid to maintain the position and options tend to expire worthless in most cases. When a market sells off strongly these options pay back and generate a strong positive outlier that “minus-Taleb” distribution features.

== See also ==
- Financial risk
- Taleb distribution
- Kurtosis risk
- Skewness risk
