= Log-t distribution =

Probability distribution

Log-t or Log-Student t
- Parameters: $\hat{\mu}$ (real), location parameter $\displaystyle \hat{\sigma} > 0\!$ (real), scale parameter $\nu$ (real), degrees of freedom (shape) parameter
- Support: $\displaystyle x \in (0, +\infty)\!$
- PDF: $p(x\mid \nu,\hat{\mu},\hat{\sigma}) = \frac{\Gamma(\frac{\nu + 1}{2})}{x\Gamma(\frac{\nu}{2})\sqrt{\pi\nu}\hat\sigma\,} \left(1+\frac{1}{\nu}\left( \frac{ \ln x-\hat{\mu} } {\hat{\sigma} } \right)^2\right)^{-\frac{\nu+1}{2}}$
- Mean: infinite
- Median: $e^\hat{\mu}\,$
- Variance: infinite
- Skewness: does not exist
- Excess kurtosis: does not exist
- MGF: does not exist

In probability theory, a log-t distribution or log-Student t distribution is a probability distribution of a random variable whose logarithm is distributed in accordance with a Student's t-distribution. If X is a random variable with a Student's t-distribution, then Y = exp(X) has a log-t distribution; likewise, if Y has a log-t distribution, then X = log(Y) has a Student's t-distribution.

== Characterization ==
The log-t distribution has the probability density function:

$$p(x\mid \nu,\hat{\mu},\hat{\sigma}) = \frac{\Gamma(\frac{\nu + 1}{2})}{x\Gamma(\frac{\nu}{2})\sqrt{\pi\nu}\hat\sigma\,} \left(1+\frac{1}{\nu}\left( \frac{ \ln x-\hat{\mu} } {\hat{\sigma} } \right)^2\right)^{-\frac{\nu+1}{2}}$$,

where $\hat{\mu}$ is the location parameter of the underlying (non-standardized) Student's t-distribution, $\hat{\sigma}$ is the scale parameter of the underlying (non-standardized) Student's t-distribution, and $\nu$ is the number of degrees of freedom of the underlying Student's t-distribution. If $\hat{\mu}=0$ and $\hat{\sigma}=1$ then the underlying distribution is the standardized Student's t-distribution.

If $\nu=1$ then the distribution is a log-Cauchy distribution. As $\nu$ approaches infinity, the distribution approaches a log-normal distribution. Although the log-normal distribution has finite moments, for any finite degrees of freedom, the mean and variance and all higher moments of the log-t distribution are infinite or do not exist.

The log-t distribution is a special case of the generalized beta distribution of the second kind. The log-t distribution is an example of a compound probability distribution between the lognormal distribution and inverse gamma distribution whereby the variance parameter of the lognormal distribution is a random variable distributed according to an inverse gamma distribution.

== Applications ==
The log-t distribution has applications in finance. For example, the distribution of stock market returns often shows fatter tails than a normal distribution, and thus tends to fit a Student's t-distribution better than a normal distribution. While the Black-Scholes model based on the log-normal distribution is often used to price stock options, option pricing formulas based on the log-t distribution can be a preferable alternative if the returns have fat tails. The fact that the log-t distribution has infinite mean is a problem when using it to value options, but there are techniques to overcome that limitation, such as by truncating the probability density function at some arbitrary large value.

The log-t distribution also has applications in hydrology and in analyzing data on cancer remission.

== Multivariate log-t distribution ==
Analogous to the log-normal distribution, multivariate forms of the log-t distribution exist. In this case, the location parameter is replaced by a vector μ, the scale parameter is replaced by a matrix Σ.
