= Kurtosis risk =

Term in decision theory

In statistics and decision theory, kurtosis risk is the risk that results when a statistical model assumes the normal distribution, but is applied to observations which have a tendency to occasionally be much further (in terms of number of standard deviations) from the average than is expected for a normal distribution.

== Overview ==
Kurtosis risk applies to any kurtosis-related quantitative model that assumes the normal distribution for certain of its independent variables when the latter may in fact have kurtosis much greater than does the normal distribution. Kurtosis risk is commonly referred to as "fat tail" risk. The "fat tail" metaphor explicitly describes the situation of having more observations at either extreme than the tails of the normal distribution would suggest; therefore, the tails are "fatter".

Ignoring kurtosis risk will cause any model to understate the risk of variables with high kurtosis. For instance, Long-Term Capital Management, a hedge fund cofounded by Myron Scholes, ignored kurtosis risk to its detriment. After four successful years, this hedge fund had to be bailed out by major investment banks in the late 1990s because it understated the kurtosis of many financial securities underlying the fund's own trading positions.

== Research by Mandelbrot ==
Benoit Mandelbrot, a French mathematician, extensively researched this issue. He felt that the extensive reliance on the normal distribution for much of the body of modern finance and investment theory is a serious flaw of any related models including the Black–Scholes option model developed by Myron Scholes and Fischer Black, and the capital asset pricing model developed by William F. Sharpe. Mandelbrot explained his views and alternative finance theory in his book: The (Mis)Behavior of Markets: A Fractal View of Risk, Ruin, and Reward published on August 3, 2004.

== See also ==
- Kurtosis
- Skewness risk
- Stochastic volatility
- Holy grail distribution
- Taleb distribution
- The Black Swan: The Impact of the Highly Improbable by Nassim Nicholas Taleb
