= Michele Wucker =

American political strategist and author

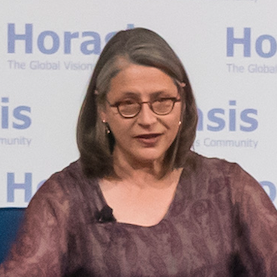
- Michele Wucker on a panel at Horasis Global China Business Meeting in 2019
- Education: Rice University, Columbia University
- Occupations: Political strategist and author
- Writing career
- Language: English, French, Spanish, Haitian Creole
- Website: wucker.com

Michele M. Wucker /’wʊkər/ (born 1969) is an American political strategist and author specializing in the world economy and crisis anticipation. She is the author of Why the Cocks Fight: Dominicans, Haitians and the Struggle for Hispaniola (1999); Lockout: Why America Keeps Getting Immigration Wrong when Our Prosperity Depends on Getting it Right (2006); and The Gray Rhino: How to Recognize and Act on the Obvious Dangers We Ignore (2016).

== Biography ==
Wucker is of American, Belgian and Austrian Slavic descent, and lives in Chicago, Illinois.

She holds a B.A. in French and Policy Studies from Rice University and a Master of International Affairs and Certificate in Latin American Studies from the School of International and Public Affairs at Columbia University. In 2012, she received a Certificate in Global Leadership and Public Policy in the 21st Century from the John F. Kennedy School of Government at Harvard University.

She worked as a news reporter at the Milwaukee Sentinel (now the Milwaukee Journal-Sentinel) in 1990, covering the local Hispanic community. She wrote about emerging markets finance at Dow Jones, AmericaEconomia, and International Financing Review. From 2000–2001, she was Latin America Bureau Chief for International Financing Review and editor of IFR Latin America.

After publishing Why the Cocks Fight, she was appointed senior fellow at the World Policy Institute, at the time part of The New School, in New York City. In 2007, she became executive director, taking the think tank independent from the university, and was named President of the World Policy Institute in 2010.

She was part of the Brookings-Duke Immigration Roundtable, which issued its recommendations in 2009. She was also part of the SUNY-Levin Institute New York in the World Advisory Council, which issued its recommendations in 2011 to New York City and State on policy responses to economic globalization.

In August 2014, Wucker left the World Policy Institute to join the Chicago Council on Global Affairs as Vice President for Studies. In 2015, she left that organization and founded Gray Rhino & Company.

== Awards ==
In 2007, she was awarded a Guggenheim Fellowship for her work on changing global conceptions of citizenship. In 2008, she became a Women's Media Center Progressive Women's Voices Alumna. In 2009, the World Economic Forum honored her as a Young Global Leader. In 2010, the Women's Media Center named Wucker a Woman Making History for her work on immigration and the relationship between the Dominican Republic and Haiti.

== Key concepts ==
=== Gray rhinos ===
Wucker introduced the term "gray rhino" at the World Economic Forum Annual Meeting in Davos, Switzerland in January 2013. Unlike highly improbable "black swans" popularized by Nassim Nicholas Taleb’s 2007 book, gray rhinos are highly probable, high impact yet neglected threats. The concept is developed further in her 2016 book, The Gray Rhino: How to Recognize and Act on the Obvious Dangers We Ignore.

The Chinese government embraced the term in a front-page editorial in the official newspaper, People's Daily, on July 17, 2017. Coming right after the important National Financial Work Conference strategy session, which occurs every five years, the official use of the "gray rhino" concept was interpreted widely as signaling a concerted effort to tighten regulation and reduce financial risk. In response, investors sold stocks perceived as risky, sending the Shenzhen small-cap stock index down 4.3% and the ChiNext tech index down 5.1%.

The New York Times referenced gray rhinos and China's policy shift in a front-page article on July 23, 2017.

The book has been translated into Hungarian, Chinese and Korean.

=== Sovereign debt crisis ===
Months before Argentina’s 2001 default, Wucker sounded an alarm that the lack of a process like an international Chapter 11 for sovereign defaults would increase the likelihood and costs of larger financial crises. In 2011, she made an early case for a preemptive restructuring and write-down of Greek sovereign debt.

=== United States immigration policy ===
In her second book, Lockout: Why America Keeps Getting Immigration Wrong When Our Prosperity Depends on Getting It Right, Wucker details the economic impact of the breakdown of the US visa bureaucracy after 9/11. She flags the widespread American misconception that earlier generations of immigrants were more likely to stay than more recent arrivals, and warns that the United States is failing to capitalize on its greatest strength. Some of her policy recommendations have been controversial, such as a 2007 New York Times op-ed that proposed reducing family preference visas for adult siblings of US citizens in return for increases in employment-related visas. Despite writing on controversial issues, she has been recognized for making her case "clearly and deliberately" and for a voice that is "wise and reasonable" and "ethical".

=== Variability of citizenship ===
Wucker was an early commentator on the economic impact of migrant worker remittances and drew attention to the ways in which countries were changing their conceptions of citizenship and political power to attract the funds workers sent home to their families. She has challenged traditional ways of thinking about citizenship, arguing that dual citizenship and other expanded definitions benefit both sending countries and host countries. Wucker has argued that non-citizen voting, also known as resident voting or municipal voting because it is limited to residents of cities in city elections, prepares people for US citizenship and helps their communities.

=== Dominican-Haitian relations ===
The New York Times Book Review described Wucker’s 1999 book, Why the Cocks Fight: Dominicans, Haitians, and the Struggle for Hispaniola, as "a complex exploration of the cultural divide between Haiti and the Dominican Republic." The book addresses historical, economic, political and social dimensions of the relationship between the two countries sharing the island of Hispaniola, viewing conflicts over culture as the symptoms rather than the root cause of the tensions. She is a recognized expert on the topic.

== Selected bibliography ==
=== Books ===
- Why the Cocks Fight: Dominicans, Haitians, and the Struggle for Hispaniola (Hill & Wang, 1999/2000) ISBN 9780809037193; Why the Cocks Fight. Farrar, Straus and Giroux. 8 April 2014. ISBN 978-1-4668-6788-8.
- Lockout: Why America Keeps Getting Immigration Wrong When Our Prosperity Depends on Getting It Right (PublicAffairs Press, 2006/2007) ISBN 9781586483562
- David Coates; Peter Siavelis (1 January 2011). "Changing Concepts of Citizenship and Nationality across Time and Space". Getting Immigration Right: What Every American Needs to Know. Potomac Books, Inc. pp. 24–. ISBN 978-1-59797-623-7.
- The Gray Rhino: How to Recognize and Act on the Obvious Dangers We Ignore. St. Martin's Press. 5 April 2016. pp. 1–. ISBN 978-1-4668-8700-8.
- You Are What You Risk:The New Art and Science of Navigating an Uncertain World. New York: Pegasus Books, Inc. 11 May 2021. ISBN 978-1-64313-678-3.
