= Multivariate Pareto distribution =

In statistics, a multivariate Pareto distribution is a multivariate extension of a univariate Pareto distribution.

There are several different types of univariate Pareto distributions including Pareto Types I−IV and Feller−Pareto. Multivariate Pareto distributions have been defined for many of these types.

== Bivariate Pareto distributions ==
=== Bivariate Pareto distribution of the first kind ===
Mardia (1962) defined a bivariate distribution with cumulative distribution function (CDF) given by

$$F(x_1, x_2) = 1 -\sum_{i=1}^2\left(\frac{x_i}{\theta_i}\right)^{-a}+ \left(\sum_{i=1}^2 \frac{x_i}{\theta_i} - 1\right)^{-a}, \qquad x_i > \theta_i > 0, i=1,2; a>0,$$

and joint density function

$$f(x_1, x_2) = (a+1)a(\theta_1 \theta_2)^{a+1}(\theta_2x_1 + \theta_1x_2 - \theta_1 \theta_2)^{-(a+2)},
\qquad x_i \geq \theta_i>0, i=1,2; a>0.$$

The marginal distributions are Pareto Type 1 with density functions

$$f(x_i)=a\theta_i^a x_i^{-(a+1)}, \qquad x_i \geq \theta_i>0, i=1,2.$$

The means and variances of the marginal distributions are

$$E[X_i] = \frac{a \theta_i}{a-1}, a>1; \quad Var(X_i)=\frac{a\theta_i^2}{(a-1)^2(a-2)}, a>2; \quad i=1,2,$$

and for a > 2, X_{1} and X_{2} are positively correlated with

$$\operatorname{cov}(X_1, X_2) = \frac{\theta_1 \theta_2}{(a-1)^2 (a-2)}, \text{ and }
\operatorname{cor}(X_1, X_2) = \frac{1}{a}.$$

=== Bivariate Pareto distribution of the second kind ===
Arnold suggests representing the bivariate Pareto Type I complementary CDF by

$$\overline{F}(x_1,x_2) = \left(1 + \sum_{i=1}^2 \frac{x_i-\theta_i}{\theta_i} \right)^{-a}, \qquad x_i > \theta_i, i=1,2.$$

If the location and scale parameter are allowed to differ, the complementary CDF is

$$\overline{F}(x_1,x_2) = \left(1 + \sum_{i=1}^2 \frac{x_i-\mu_i}{\sigma_i} \right)^{-a}, \qquad x_i > \mu_i, i=1,2,$$

which has Pareto Type II univariate marginal distributions. This distribution is called a multivariate Pareto distribution of type II by Arnold. (This definition is not equivalent to Mardia's bivariate Pareto distribution of the second kind.)

For a > 1, the marginal means are

$$E[X_i] = \mu_i + \frac{\sigma_i}{a-1}, \qquad i=1,2,$$

while for a > 2, the variances, covariance, and correlation are the same as for multivariate Pareto of the first kind.

== Multivariate Pareto distributions ==
=== Multivariate Pareto distribution of the first kind ===
Mardia's Multivariate Pareto distribution of the First Kind has the joint probability density function given by

$$f(x_1,\dots,x_k) = a(a+1)\cdots(a+k-1) \left(\prod_{i=1}^k \theta_i \right)^{-1}
\left(\sum_{i=1}^k \frac{x_i}{\theta_i} - k + 1 \right)^{-(a+k)},
\qquad x_i > \theta_i > 0, a > 0,   \qquad (1)$$

The marginal distributions have the same form as (1), and the one-dimensional marginal distributions have a Pareto Type I distribution. The complementary CDF is

$$\overline{F}(x_1,\dots,x_k) = \left(\sum_{i=1}^k \frac{x_i}{\theta_i}-k+1 \right)^{-a},
\qquad x_i > \theta_i > 0, i=1,\dots,k; a > 0.   \quad (2)$$

The marginal means and variances are given by

$$E[X_i] = \frac{a \theta_i}{a-1}, \text{ for } a > 1, \text{ and }
Var(X_i) = \frac{a \theta_i^2}{(a-1)^2 (a-2)}, \text{ for } a > 2.$$

If a > 2 the covariances and correlations are positive with

$$\operatorname{cov}(X_i, X_j) = \frac{\theta_i \theta_j}{(a-1)^2(a-2)}, \qquad \operatorname{cor}(X_i, X_j) = \frac{1}{a}, \qquad i \neq j.$$

=== Multivariate Pareto distribution of the second kind ===
Arnold suggests representing the multivariate Pareto Type I complementary CDF by

$$\overline{F}(x_1, \dots, x_k) = \left(1 + \sum_{i=1}^k \frac{x_i-\theta_i}{\theta_i} \right)^{-a}, \qquad x_i > \theta_i>0, \quad i=1,\dots, k.$$

If the location and scale parameter are allowed to differ, the complementary CDF is

$$\overline{F}(x_1,\dots,x_k) = \left(1 + \sum_{i=1}^k \frac{x_i-\mu_i}{\sigma_i} \right)^{-a}, \qquad x_i > \mu_i, \quad i=1,\dots,k, \qquad (3)$$

which has marginal distributions of the same type (3) and Pareto Type II univariate marginal distributions. This distribution is called a multivariate Pareto distribution of type II by Arnold.

For a > 1, the marginal means are

$$E[X_i] = \mu_i + \frac{\sigma_i}{a-1}, \qquad i=1,\dots,k,$$

while for a > 2, the variances, covariances, and correlations are the same as for multivariate Pareto of the first kind.

=== Multivariate Pareto distribution of the fourth kind ===
A random vector X has a k-dimensional multivariate Pareto distribution of the Fourth Kind if its joint survival function is

$$\overline{F}(x_1,\dots,x_k) = \left( 1 + \sum_{i=1}^k \left(\frac{x_i-\mu_i}{\sigma_i}\right)^{1/\gamma_i}\right)^{-a}, \qquad
x_i > \mu_i,  \sigma_i > 0, i=1,\dots,k; a > 0. \qquad (4)$$

The k_{1}-dimensional marginal distributions (k_{1}<k) are of the same type as (4), and the one-dimensional marginal distributions are Pareto Type IV.

=== Multivariate Feller–Pareto distribution ===
A random vector X has a k-dimensional Feller–Pareto distribution if

$$X_i = \mu_i + (W_i / Z)^{\gamma_i}, \qquad i=1,\dots,k,  \qquad (5)$$

where

$$W_i \sim \Gamma(\beta_i, 1), \quad i=1,\dots,k, \qquad Z \sim \Gamma(\alpha, 1),$$

are independent gamma variables. The marginal distributions and conditional distributions are of the same type (5); that is, they are multivariate Feller–Pareto distributions. The one–dimensional marginal distributions are of Feller−Pareto type.
