= Grey swan =

Term for events that rarely happens

A grey swan is an event that is known and possible to happen, but which is assumed to be unlikely to occur. The term derives from black swan theory, which describes an event which is unlikely but unknown.

In electrical engineering, gray swan refers to the kind of events that rarely happen but have great impact on power systems.

== See also ==
- Resilience (engineering and construction)
- Resilient control systems
