= Risk of ruin =

Concept in gambling, insurance, and finance

Risk of ruin is a concept in gambling, insurance, and finance relating to the likelihood of losing all one's investment capital or extinguishing one's bankroll below the minimum for further play. For instance, if someone bets all their money on a simple coin toss, the risk of ruin is 50%. In a multiple-bet scenario, risk of ruin accumulates with the number of bets: each play increases the risk, and persistent play ultimately yields the stochastic certainty of gambler's ruin.

== Finance ==
=== Risk of ruin for investors ===
Two leading strategies for minimising the risk of ruin are diversification and hedging/portfolio optimization. An investor who pursues diversification will try to own a broad range of assets – they might own a mix of shares, bonds, real estate and liquid assets like cash and gold. The portfolios of bonds and shares might themselves be split over different markets – for example a highly diverse investor might like to own shares on the LSE, the NYSE and various other bourses. So even if there is a major crash affecting the shares on any one exchange, only a part of the investors holdings should suffer losses. Protecting from risk of ruin by diversification became more challenging after the 2008 financial crisis – at various periods during the crises, until it was stabilised in mid-2009, there were periods when asset classes correlated in all global regions.

For example, there were times when stocks and bonds fell at once – normally when stocks fall in value, bonds will rise, and vice versa. Other strategies for minimising risk of ruin include carefully controlling the use of leverage and exposure to assets that have unlimited loss when things go wrong (e.g., some financial products that involve short selling can deliver high returns, but if the market goes against the trade, the investor can lose significantly more than the price they paid to buy the product.)

The probability of ruin is approximately

$$P(\mathrm{ruin}) = \left(\frac{2}{1+\frac{\mu}{r}}-1\right)^{\frac{s}{r}}$$,

where

$$r = \sqrt{\mu^2+\sigma^2}$$

for a random walk with a starting value of s, and at every iterative step, is moved by a normal distribution having mean μ and standard deviation σ and failure occurs if it reaches 0 or a negative value. For example, with a starting value of 10, at each iteration, a Gaussian random variable having mean 0.1 and standard deviation 1 is added to the value from the previous iteration. In this formula, s is 10, σ is 1, μ is 0.1, and so r is the square root of 1.01, or about 1.005. The mean of the distribution added to the previous value every time is positive, but not nearly as large as the standard deviation, so there is a risk of it falling to negative values before taking off indefinitely toward positive infinity. This formula predicts a probability of failure using these parameters of about 0.1371, or a 13.71% risk of ruin. This approximation becomes more accurate when the number of steps typically expected for ruin to occur, if it occurs, becomes larger; it is not very accurate if the very first step could make or break it. This is because it is an exact solution if the random variable added at each step is not a Gaussian random variable but rather a binomial random variable with parameter n=2. However, repeatedly adding a random variable that is not distributed by a Gaussian distribution into a running sum in this way asymptotically becomes indistinguishable from adding Gaussian distributed random variables, by the law of large numbers.

=== Financial trading ===
The term "risk of ruin" is sometimes used in a narrow technical sense by financial traders to refer to the risk of losses reducing a trading account below minimum requirements to make further trades. Random walk assumptions permit precise calculation of the risk of ruin for a given number of trades. For example, assume one has $1000 available in an account that one can afford to draw down before the broker will start issuing margin calls. Also, assume each trade can either win or lose, with a 50% chance of a loss, capped at $200. Then for four trades or less, the risk of ruin is zero. For five trades, the risk of ruin is about 3% since all five trades would have to fail for the account to be ruined. For additional trades, the accumulated risk of ruin slowly increases. Calculations of risk become much more complex under a realistic variety of conditions. To see a set of formulae to cover simple related scenarios, see Gambler's ruin (with Markov chain). Opinions among traders about the importance of the "risk of ruin" calculations are mixed; some advise that for practical purposes it is a close to worthless statistic, while others say it is of the utmost importance for an active trader.

== See also ==
- Absorbing Markov chain (used in mathematical finance to calculate risk of ruin)
- Asset allocation
- Fat-tailed distribution (exhibits the difficulty and unreliability of calculating risk of ruin)
- Financial risk management
- Financial risk modeling
- Kelly criterion
- Key risk indicators
- Operational risk management
- Risk management
- St. Petersburg paradox (an imaginary game with no risk of ruin and positive expected returns, yet paradoxically perceived to be of low investment value)
- Value at risk
