= Taleb distribution =

Type of probability distribution in economics

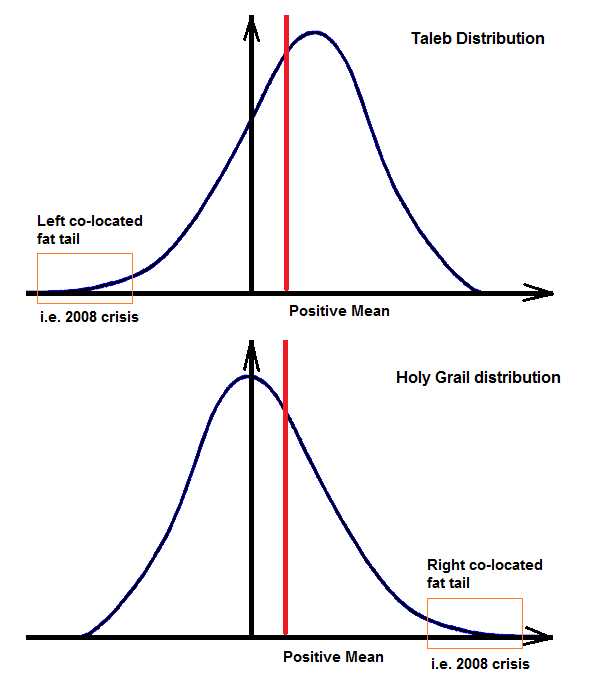
Taleb and Holy Grail Distributions

In economics and finance, a Taleb distribution is the statistical profile of an investment which normally provides a payoff of small positive returns, while carrying a small but significant risk of catastrophic losses. The term was coined by journalist Martin Wolf and economist John Kay to describe investments with a "high probability of a modest gain and a low probability of huge losses in any period."

The concept is named after Nassim Nicholas Taleb, based on ideas outlined in his book Fooled by Randomness.

According to Taleb in Silent Risk, the term should be called "payoff" to reflect the importance of the payoff function of the underlying probability distribution, rather than the distribution itself. The term is meant to refer to an investment returns profile in which there is a high probability of a small gain, and a small probability of a very large loss, which more than outweighs the gains. In these situations the expected value is very much less than zero, but this fact is camouflaged by the appearance of low risk and steady returns. It is a combination of kurtosis risk and skewness risk: overall returns are dominated by extreme events (kurtosis), which are to the downside (skew). Such kind of distributions have been studied in economic time series related to business cycles.

More detailed and formal discussion of the bets on small probability events is in the academic essay by Taleb, called "Why Did the Crisis of 2008 Happen?" and in the 2004 paper in the Journal of Behavioral Finance called "Why Do We Prefer Asymmetric Payoffs?" in which he writes "agents risking other people’s capital would have the incentive to camouflage the properties by showing a steady income. Intuitively, hedge funds are paid on an annual basis while disasters happen every four or five years, for example. The fund manager does not repay his incentive fee."

== Criticism of trading strategies ==
Pursuing a trading strategy with a Taleb distribution yields a high probability of steady returns for a time, but with a risk of ruin that approaches eventual certainty over time. This is done consciously by some as a risky trading strategy, while some critics argue that it is done either unconsciously by some, unaware of the hazards ("innocent fraud"), or consciously by others, particularly in hedge funds.

=== Risky strategy ===
If done consciously, with one's own capital or openly disclosed to investors, this is a risky strategy, but appeals to some: one will want to exit the trade before the rare event happens. This occurs for instance in a speculative bubble, where one purchases an asset in the expectation that it will likely go up, but may plummet, and hopes to sell the asset before the bubble bursts.

This has also been referred to as "picking up pennies in front of a steamroller".

=== "Innocent fraud" ===
John Kay has likened securities trading to bad driving, as both are characterized by Taleb distributions. Drivers can make many small gains in time by taking risks such as overtaking on the inside and tailgating, however, they are then at risk of experiencing a very large loss in the form of a serious traffic accident. Kay has described Taleb Distributions as the basis of the carry trade and has claimed that along with mark-to-market accounting and other practices, constitute part of what John Kenneth Galbraith has called "innocent fraud".

=== Moral hazard ===
Some critics of the hedge fund industry claim that the compensation structure generates high fees for investment strategies that follow a Taleb distribution, creating moral hazard. In such a scenario, the fund can claim high asset management and performance fees until they suddenly "blow up", losing the investor significant sums of money and wiping out all the gains to the investor generated in previous periods; however, the fund manager keeps all fees earned prior to the losses being incurred – and ends up enriching himself in the long run because he does not pay for his losses.

== Risks ==
Taleb distributions pose several fundamental problems, all possibly leading to risk being overlooked:

presence of extreme adverse events
The very presence or possibility of adverse events may pose a problem per se, which is ignored by only looking at the average case – a decision may be good in expectation (in the aggregate, in the long term), but a single rare event may ruin the investor.
unobserved events
This is Taleb's central contention, which he calls black swans – because extreme events are rare, they have often not been observed yet, and thus are not included in scenario analysis or stress testing.
hard-to-compute expectation
A subtler issue is that expectation is very sensitive to assumptions about probability: a trade with a $1 gain 99.9% of the time and a $500 loss 0.1% of the time has positive expected value; while if the $500 loss occurs 0.2% of the time it has approximately 0 expected value; and if the $500 loss occurs 0.3% of the time it has negative expected value. This is exacerbated by the difficulty of estimating the probability of rare events (in this example one would need to observe thousands of trials to estimate the probability with confidence), and by the use of financial leverage: mistaking a small loss for a small gain and magnifying by leverage yields a hidden large loss.

More formally, while the risks for a known distribution can be calculated, in practice one does not know the distribution: one is operating under uncertainty, in economics called Knightian uncertainty.

== Mitigants ==
A number of mitigants have been proposed, by Taleb and others. These include:

not exposing oneself to large losses using the barbell strategy
For instance, only buying options (so one can at most lose the premium), not selling them. Many funds have started offering "tail protection" such as the one advocated by Taleb.
performing sensitivity analysis on assumptions
This does not eliminate the risk, but identifies which assumptions are key to conclusions, and thus meriting close scrutiny.
scenario analysis and stress testing
Widely used in industry, they do not include unforeseen events but emphasize various possibilities and what one stands to lose, so one is not blinded by absence of losses thus far.
using non-probabilistic decision techniques
While most classical decision theory is based on probabilistic techniques of expected value or expected utility, alternatives exist which do not require assumptions about the probabilities of various outcomes, and are thus robust. These include minimax, minimax regret, and info-gap decision theory.
altering pay structure to reduce moral hazard
For workers in the financial industry whose strategies follow a Taleb distribution, linking success to long-term (not cash) rewards, which can be withdrawn in the event of intervening failure. For example, paying banks staff in long-term stock options in their bank rather than in cash bonuses.
adding to asset allocation a strategy with a holy grail distribution of returns
Adding a complementary strategy with a performance pattern that helps reduce the impact of market performance shocks (holy grail distribution)

== See also ==
- Fat-tailed distribution
- Gambler's ruin
- Holy grail distribution
- Kurtosis risk
- Skewness risk
- The Black Swan: The Impact of the Highly Improbable
