= Estelle Bee Dagum =

Argentinian economist (1935–2026)

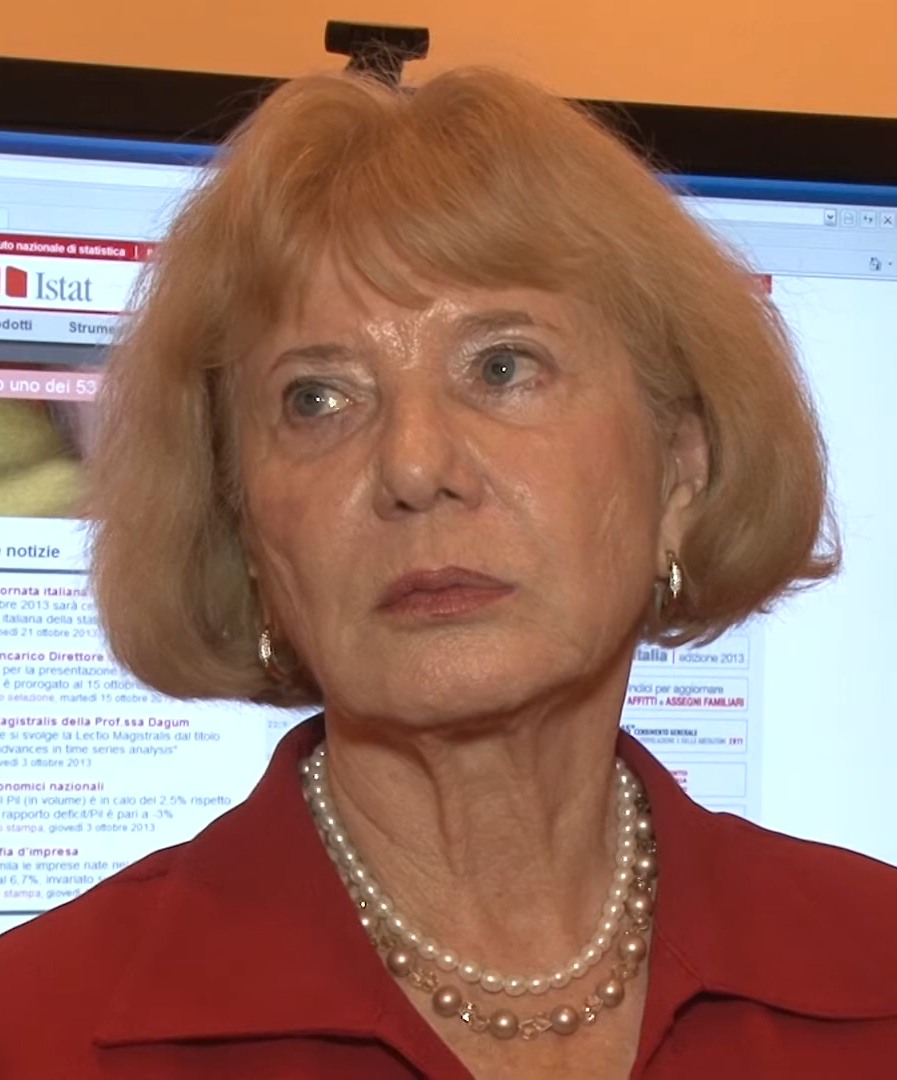
- Dagum in 2013
- Born: 8 January 1935; Córdoba, Córdoba Province, Argentina
- Died: 2 April 2026 (aged 91)
- Citizenship: Argentina; Canada
- Organizations: Mathematica Policy Research; American Statistical Association; International Statistical Institute; Statistics Canada; Central Statistical Office
- Spouse: Camilo Dagum

Academic background
- Education: National University of Córdoba; London School of Economics; Princeton University

Academic work
- Discipline: Economics; Statistics
- Institutions: National University of Córdoba; London School of Economics; Catholic University of Córdoba; Princeton University; National Autonomous University of Mexico; University of Iowa; Coe College; Ottawa University; University of Bologna
- Estelle Bee Dagum's voice On recent advancements in time series analysis Recorded October 2013

Estela "Estelle" Bee Dagum (8 January 1935 – 2 April 2026) was an Argentine and Canadian economist and statistician who was a professor "chiara fama" of statistical sciences at the University of Bologna. She is known for her research on time series analysis, and in particular for developing the X-11-ARIMA method of seasonal adjustment, which became widely used and is a predecessor to X-12-ARIMA and later methods.

Dagum was the author of the books Benchmarking, Temporal Distribution, and Reconciliation Methods for Time Series (with Pierre A. Cholette, Springer, 2006) and Seasonal Adjustment Methods and Real Time Trend-Cycle Estimation (with Silvia Bianconcini, Springer, 2016).

== Life and career ==
Dagum was born on 8 January 1935 in Córdoba, Argentina. She graduated in 1957 from the National University of Córdoba, and earned a Ph.D. in economics from the same university in 1960. After postdoctoral research in macroeconomics, econometrics, and operations research at the London School of Economics, she returned to the National University of Córdoba as an assistant professor in 1963. She moved to the Catholic University of Córdoba briefly in 1965, but in 1966 returned to the National University as a full professor. However, at this time she moved to Princeton, New Jersey, where she did a second postdoctorate from 1966 to 1968. Along with game theory, the subjects she worked on at this time included mathematical statistics and time series, major themes in her later work. During her time at Princeton she also worked as a research economist at Mathematica Policy Research.

From 1968 to 1972 she held a sequence of professorships in mathematical economics at the National Autonomous University of Mexico, University of Iowa, Coe College, and Ottawa University. Finally in 1972 she began working at Statistics Canada, where she would stay for many years, taking Canadian citizenship and changing her first name to Estelle (but continuing to use "Estela" for her publications). She retired from Statistics Canada in 1993 and worked from 1994 to 1996 in the Central Statistical Office in London. She took her position at the University of Bologna in 1997.

Dagum died on 2 April 2026.

== Recognition ==
In 1980, Dagum became the inaugural recipient of the Julius Shiskin Memorial Award for Economic Statistics, given by the Business and Economic Statistics Section of the American Statistical Association. She was given the award "for her outstanding achievement in economic statistics, particularly for widely recognized contributions in time series analysis and for extending Julius Shiskin's pioneering work in seasonal adjustment by combining the X-11 seasonal adjustment program with the Box-Jenkins ARIMA models and especially the development of the X-11-ARIMA method".

In 1981, she was elected as a Fellow of the American Statistical Association, and in 1984 she was elected as a member of the International Statistical Institute. She became a corresponding member of the Academy of Sciences of the Institute of Bologna, in their section on law, economics, and finance, in 2002.

In 2005 the Parthenope University of Naples gave her an honorary doctorate, and in 2010 the National University of Córdoba named her as an honorary professor.

Her book Seasonal Adjustment Methods and Real Time Trend-Cycle Estimation won the 2016 Eric Ziegel Award of Technometrics.
