= Alpine Town of the Year =

Coordinates: 46.5500°N 15.6500°E

Association Alpine Town of the Year
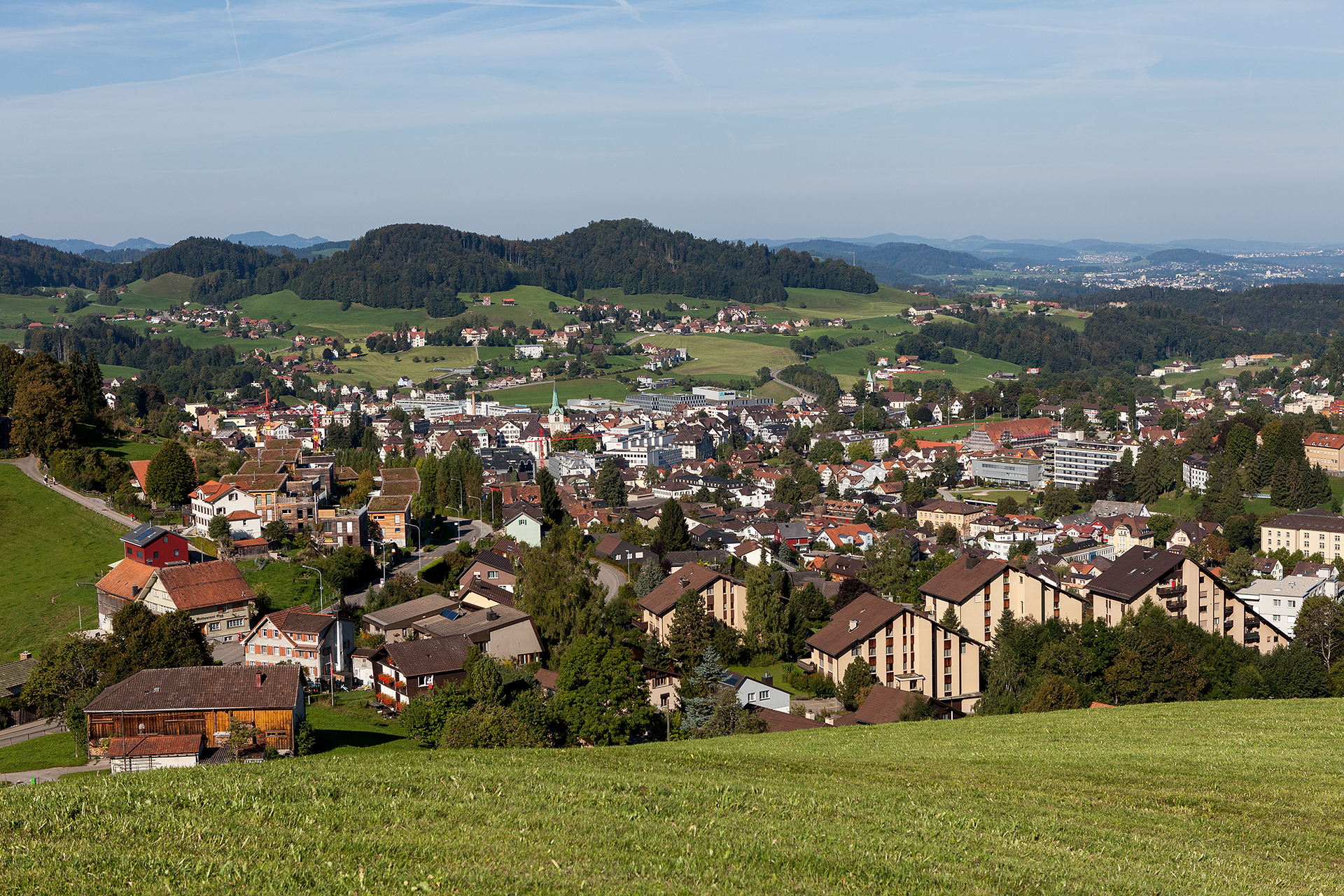
- Herisau, 2003 Alpine Town of the Year
- Purpose: nature conservancy, Spatial Planning, Sustainable Development, energy efficiency
- Location: Bad Reichenhall/Germany
- Members: 15 Towns
- Board of directors: Hubert Buhl
- Website: www.alpenstaedte.org, www.cittaalpina.org, www.villedesalpes.org, www.alpskomesto.org

The Alpine Town of the Year award is given to towns which have made exceptional efforts for the realization of the Alpine Convention and for sustainable development. The Alpine Towns of the Year are members of the international association of the same name.

== The Alpine Town of the Year Award ==
The honorary title Alpine Town of the Year is awarded annually by the general meeting of the association's members at the recommendation of a jury. The jury examines the projects and proposals of the candidates on the basis of ecological, social and economic criteria. Every town in the area covered by the Alpine Convention can apply for the award. The designated Alpine Town of the Year organizes a workshop during which its programme is presented at least six months before the actual Alpine Town Year. During the Alpine Town Year, there will be at least three international events, and two sustainable projects will be realized. The award and the cooperation across linguistic and geographical borders put the participating towns into the limelight, give wide publicity to their efforts for sustainable development and strengthen the links among the participating towns. The Alpine Town Year can also stimulate the realization of projects: the Dobratsch Nature Park in Villach (Austria), for example, is based on the Alpine Town concept.

== Objectives ==
The Alpine Town of the Year Association has five objectives:

- Strengthening awareness of the Alps as a space where people and nature coexist.
- Involving the population in the programme and projects of the Alpine Town of the Year.
- Strengthening links within the region through cooperation with the hinterland.
- Creating a sustainable future by realizing the basic concept of the Alpine Convention through concrete projects.
- Increasing cooperation among the towns in the Alps.

== The Alpine Town of the Year Association ==
The towns which have received the Alpine Town of the Year award cooperate in the association. The association has an office in Bad Reichenhall, Germany.

=== The Jury ===
The jury examines the submissions and makes a recommendation on the next Alpine Town of the Year to the General Meeting. It provides the town with advice on substantive issues and receives the town's final report. The jury consists of three representatives of Alpine-wide organizations. They are elected every two years by the General Meeting. The present members are Norbert Weixlbaumer (CIPRA International), Cristina Del Biaggio (University of Ginevra), Antonio Zambon (Community Network Alliance in the Alps) and Gerhard Leeb (Pro Vita Alpina).

=== The General Assembly ===
The representatives of the Alpine Towns of the Year meet twice a year in a different town. The General Assembly elects the Alpine Town of the Year, the jury and the Board, and determines the overall orientation of the association's activities. The General Association also serves as a personal communication platform among the towns, overcoming linguistic barriers.

=== The Board ===
The Board has three to five members - burgomasters or their legitimate representatives. The Board is responsible for the day-to-day activities of the association. Its present members are Thierry Billet (president, Annecy), Bojan Sever (vice president, Idrija), Ingrid Fischer (assessor, Sonthofen).

=== The Consultant ===
Every town designates a contact person or consultant who serves as the interface between the town, the other members and the association's office. The consultant is also responsible for the local realization of the association's objectives.

=== The Office ===
The office is responsible for the association's day-to-day activities; it has been run by CIPRA International since 2003. CIPRA has been represented on the jury since 1997.

== Projects ==
Every Alpine town implements at least two local projects reflecting the association's objectives in its Alpine Town Year. These are stored in an online data bank. In addition, any other projects are regularly presented in the association's newsletter, which appears in four languages. The Alpine Town Association is a partner in the Alpine Space Programme Alpstar. The project's objective is to make the Alps a climate-neutral region. The project started in July 2011 and ended in March 2014.

== Cooperation ==
=== The Alpine Convention ===
In 2008, the Permanent Secretariat of the Alpine Convention and the association signed a Memorandum of Understanding for continuous cooperation. The association has been an official observer with the Alpine Convention since 2011. As such, the association takes part in the meetings of the Permanent Commission and in the biennial Alpine Conference. The association has no voting rights but can submit its proposals directly to the policy makers of the participating countries.

=== The Municipal Network Alliance in the Alps ===
There is a regular exchange of information between the municipal network Alliance in the Alps and the association, for example during the joint meetings of the Boards. In addition, there are towns which are members of both networks, such as Sonthofen and Annecy.

The International Commission for the Protection of the Alps (CIPRA) runs the association's office and is represented on the jury. The association and CIPRA, among other things, jointly organize events. An international meeting in Lecco (Italy), for example, was held in 2013.

== The Alpine Towns ==
Year	Location	Alpine State
1997	Villach	Austria
1999	Belluno	Italy
2000	Maribor	Slovenia
2001	Bad Reichenhall	Germany
2002	Gap	France
2003	Herisau	Switzerland
2004	Trento	Italy
2005	Sonthofen	Germany
2006	Chambéry	France
2007	Sondrio	Italy
2008	Brig-Glis	Switzerland
2009	Bolzano	Italy
2010	Bad Aussee	Austria
2011	Idrija	Slovenia
2012	Annecy	France
2013	Lecco	Italy
2015	Chamonix	France
2016	Tolmin	Slovenia
2017	Tolmezzo	Italy
2018	Bressanone	Italy
2019	Morbegno	Italy
2021	Biella	Italy
2022	Passy	France
2024	Cuneo	Italy
