= Commercial location development =

Commercial location development (CLD) is a method used by the public sector to position its territory and create a good frame condition for the development of its economy. After having made a thorough diagnosis of the actual situation the public entities design a marketing strategy of the location, which includes, as in any marketing mix, the target groups definition (type of enterprises they want to conserve or attract), the offer, the pricing, the promotion and the sale's strategy. The topic includes the recruitment and retention of the appropriate human capital.

The design of a CLD strategy allows local governments to manage their territorial and economic development accorded to fixed and legitimized goals instead of having to react to single cases and demands in a short time. The concerned territory can be municipal, inter-municipal or larger.

The aim of this article is to present the methodology and tools used for designing a Commercial Location Development strategy.

== Methodology and tools ==
=== Territorial diagnosis ===
The first step consists of assessing the CLD situation at the level of the considered territory. This can be done using both statistical data and interviews of local stakeholders. The collected information is then summarized using i.e. a balanced scorecard (BSC) or SWOT analysis.

=== Competition analysis ===
After having identified the main territorial competitors, these ones are then assessed using as far as possible the same tools as for the territorial diagnosis. The results are then compared in order to determine in which topics and frame conditions the concerned commercial location has to improve to enhance its competitiveness versus its competitors.

=== Benchmarking ===
Ideas for the new strategy are then developed taking inspiration out of a benchmarking analysis and/or a best practices or worst practices inventory.

=== Designing of a commercial location development strategy ===
The strategy is then designed, democratically validated and implemented.

== See also ==
- Alpine Space Programme - European Territorial Cooperation 2007-2013
- Comunis
- Land use planning
- Inter-municipal cooperation
- Spatial planning
- Regional planning
- European Spatial Development Perspective
- Special economic zone
- Urban planning
- City marketing
- Industrial ecology
