= Hybrid organization =

Theoretical concept

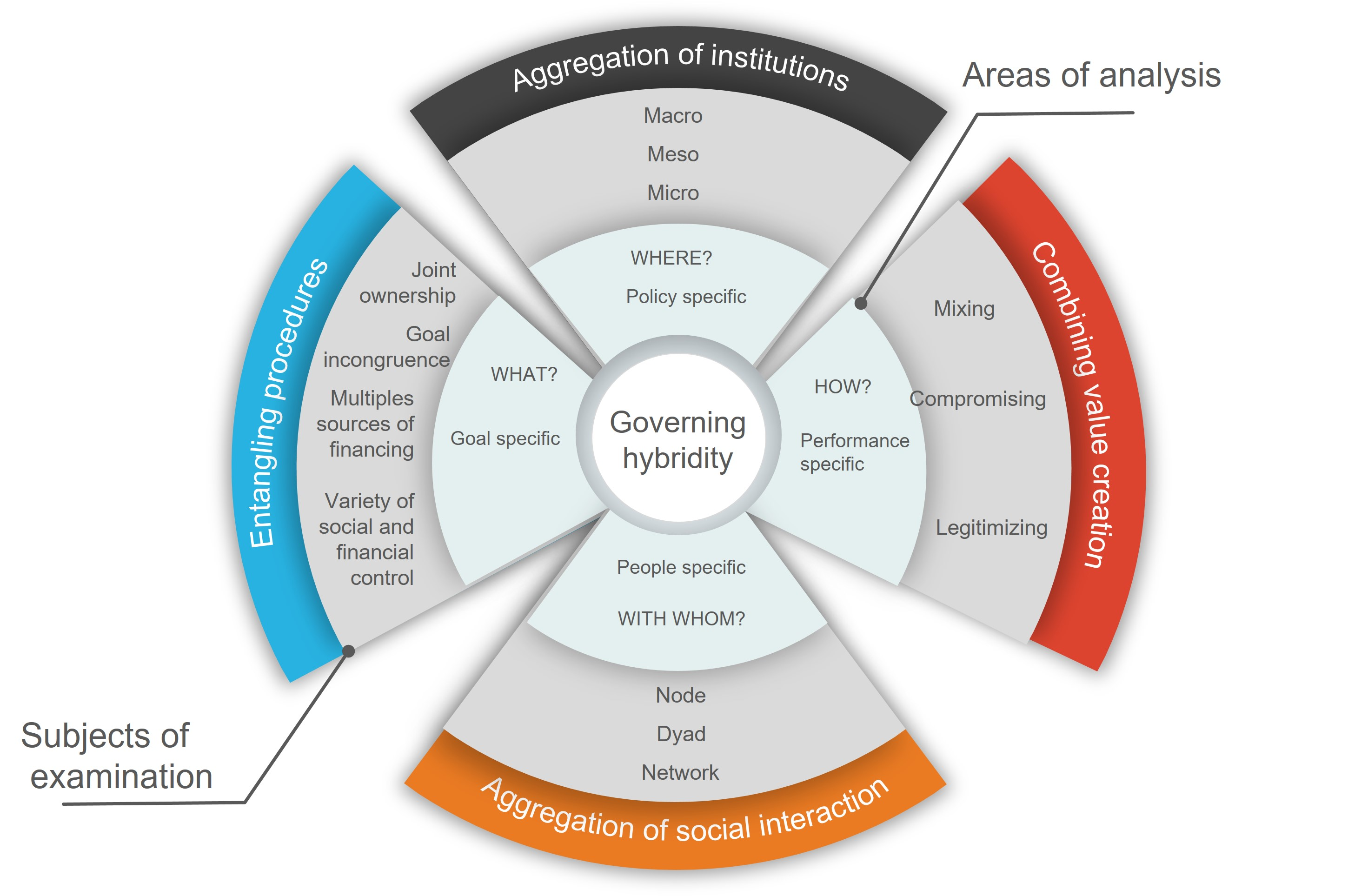
Governing hybridity

A hybrid organization is an organization that mixes elements, value systems, and action logics (e.g., social impact and profit generation) from various sectors of society, namely the public sector, the private sector, and the voluntary sector. A more general notion of hybridity can be found in hybrid institutions and governance.

According to previous research, hybrids bridging the public and private spheres consist of the following features:

1. Shared ownership
2. Goal incongruence and diverging institutional logics within the same organisation
3. Variety in the sources of financing
4. Differentiated forms of economic and social control

Value creation in hybrids proceeds through three mechanisms:

1. Mixing
2. Compromising
3. Legitimizing

Mixing distinct value categories may take several forms, with the primary characteristic being the combination of existing value domains to generate novel variants of value. Compromising concerns resolving grievances and trade-offs among interacting parties. From a legitimisation perspective, hybrids are attuned to catering to the competing demands of multiple audiences: governments, citizens, clients, and competitive markets.

The discussion of relational aspects of hybridity among nodes, dyads, and networks raises a number of analytical questions. Governing hybridity often necessitates a balancing act between parallel and opposing forces. While hybridity can represent an effort to build genuinely new interaction patterns to settle complex issues, it can also impose strict constraints on existing interaction models.

Hybridity can be studied across levels of society within micro, meso, and macro settings. However, the aggregation of institutions follows different structural patterns within government, business, and civil society.

A hybrid organization can achieve a competitive advantage through its ability to rapidly adapt to fluid institutional environments. Organizational hybridity refers to this capacity to blend features from disparate organizational templates or cultures to engineer tailored strategic solutions. In addition, hybrid organizations can secure long-term sustainability by balancing social and economic imperatives while systematically engaging with diverse stakeholder groups.

== Hybrid organizations and knowledge strategies ==
Hybrid organizations involve collaboration across private, public, and non-profit sectors. Because each participating organization possesses distinct institutional priorities, the overarching hybrid structure must manage an integrated knowledge strategy. This systemic complexity renders the operational challenges of hybrid configurations inherently interdependent and multidimensional. To successfully formulate a coherent knowledge strategy, a hybrid organization must address three primary considerations:

- Identification of critical knowledge assets.
- Determination of strategic decision-making authority and the underlying information architecture supporting those decisions.
- Explicit delineation of organizational identity, specifically regarding how to reconcile conflicting values, goals, and cultures across the participating entities.

== Performance management in hybrid organizations ==
Hybridity—characterized by mixed ownership, complex governance modes, goal incongruence, and competing institutional logics—presents significant challenges for performance management, specifically regarding goal setting and performance measurement. In goal setting, hybrid organizations must reconcile the divergent interests of stakeholders such as taxpayers, equity investors, and private donors. The juxtaposition of public and private governance architectures complicates organizational mandate formulation, requiring the alignment of electoral accountability and commercial ownership systems. Goal incongruence routinely leads to friction over whether to prioritize public, shareholder, or social value, necessitating structured compromises. Competing institutional logics add additional complexity regarding the tension between government market interventions, voluntary sector mission alignment, and open-market efficiency.

In performance measurement, hybridity requires tailored metrics capable of evaluating public, private, and voluntary benchmarks concurrently. Measuring organizational efficacy becomes complex due to the requirement to track progress toward multidimensional, occasionally conflicting targets, such as financial returns, localized social value, and broader public value. This overlap of governance dynamics pressures accounting frameworks to satisfy the information demands of both public democratic oversight and private shareholding. Goal incongruence further complicates evaluation, as internal friction can emerge regarding which primary metrics accurately signal success. Furthermore, performance tracking configurations must simultaneously monitor market competitiveness, interventionist efficacy, and civil mission fulfillment while accommodating the varying motivational orientations of employees drawn from different occupational sectors. Finally, managing multiple distinct funding streams—including tax revenue, charitable donations, and private venture capital—requires robust auditing systems to maintain structural transparency and cross-sector resource allocation efficiency.

== Differences between public and private sectors ==
Hybrid organizations operate across both the public and private spheres, though they exhibit notable structural differences in their strategic drivers, operating environments, transactional processes, and overarching roles.

In the private sector, hybrid entities are typically driven by market metrics, deploying social or environmental value generation as a vehicle to support core financial objectives. Conversely, public sector hybrids generally prioritize structural social mandates, leveraging economic sustainability mechanisms to safely execute their primary mission.

Furthermore, public sector hybrid organizations are often subject to more restrictive regulatory frameworks and comprehensive statutory reporting standards than their counterparts in the private market.

== Terminology ==
Bryan Borys and David B. Jemison introduced the concept of "hybrid organizational arrangements", aligning the framework with corporate strategic alliances, research and development partnerships, joint ventures, and licensing agreements. The authors provided a qualitative framework for classifying these structures based on their breadth of purpose, boundary determination, value creation dynamics, and stability mechanisms.

Later, Oliver Williamson integrated the concept of a "hybrid form" into transaction cost economics. A hybrid form can be defined as "a set of organizations such that coordination between those organizations takes place by means of the price mechanism and various other coordination mechanisms simultaneously."

== Effects ==
Because hybrid organizations merge disparate stakeholder groups, they carry an elevated potential for internal institutional friction, magnifying the complexities of stakeholder management. This systemic friction emerges as hybrids attempt to establish an equilibrium between competing external demands and localized internal interests.

This operational challenge is also emphasized within agency theory. The "multiple principal problem" outlines various collective action problems inherent to hybrid structures. Issues such as free-riding or systemic duplication in steering and auditing procedures can significantly elevate bureaucratic costs. Similarly, directive ambiguity or individual stakeholder lobbying can induce structural inefficiencies.

These institutional tensions can generate positive or negative economic, performance, cultural, and governance outcomes for the organization, its principals, and its end consumers. For example, regarding state-owned enterprises, Schmitz argues that blending public and private interests provides an optimal combination of incentives for cost reduction and quality improvement compared to pure public or private production models. Conversely, Voorn, Van Genugten, and Van Thiel hypothesize that while diversity of ownership can capture market specialization benefits and elevate efficiency, it also introduces higher structural failure rates.

== Examples ==
Examples of hybrid forms of organization include:

- Public service organizations established by third-sector actors, such as (in European contexts) social housing providers, public schools, and health hospitals.
- Public sector entities operating via business models, such as state-owned enterprises that compete directly on the open marketplace.
- Private sector structural arrangements, including commercial franchising networks, multinational joint ventures, and diversified business groups.
- Benefit corporations or social enterprises that prioritize social and environmental causes while generating profit.
- Associations, specifically industrial trade associations, that pair non-profit, impact-oriented functions (public relations, lobbying, special interest groups) with commercial activities (e.g., corporate events, professional seminars, consulting) managed through a wholly owned subsidiary.
- Microfinance organizations providing targeted financial services to structurally underserved populations.
- Islamic banks that align religious principles with contemporary commercial banking practices.
- Corporations engaging in corporate social entrepreneurship, advancing social and environmental projects alongside traditional shareholder returns.
- Hybrid co-operatives that intentionally incorporate multiple distinct stakeholder groups.
- Hybrid ventures that embed financial, social, and environmental goals into new startup frameworks.

== Intentionality ==
Not all hybrid forms are structured intentionally, as cross-sector value creation often occurs "by default." Hemingway's ethnographic study of a British multinational corporation—where corporate social responsibility was practiced informally by employees outside their mandated roles—indicated that unless an employee is structurally exempt from the profit motive to generate social value, the overarching corporation cannot be classified as a true social enterprise staffed by social entrepreneurs. However, she noted empirical evidence of corporate social entrepreneurship, where specific employees autonomously expanded their operational parameters to encompass explicit social responsibilities.
