= Samtgemeinde =

Association of municipalities in Lower Saxony

A Samtgemeinde (German pronunciation: ['zamtgəˌmaɪndə], lit. 'collective municipality'; plural: Samtgemeinden) is a type of administrative division in Lower Saxony, Germany. Samtgemeinden are local government associations of municipalities, equivalent to the Ämter in Schleswig-Holstein, Mecklenburg-Vorpommern, and Brandenburg, and the Verbandsgemeinden in Rhineland-Palatinate.

== Function ==
A Samtgemeinde is a government body composed of a collective association of gemeinden (municipalities), the lowest level of official territorial division in Germany. Samtgemeinden were introduced in Lower Saxony on 4 March 1955 upon the adoption of the Lower Saxony Municipal Code (Niedersächsische Gemeindeordnung), which was based on British administrative structures at the time. According to §71 paragraph 1 Lower Saxony law on local government, a Samtgemeinde should have at least 7,000 inhabitants. Approximately 80% of the municipalities in Lower Saxony have united to Samtgemeinden.

The Samtgemeinde executes many local government administrative duties for its member municipalities, including land use planning, wastewater disposal, social security, organisation of cemeteries and fire stations, sponsorship of elementary schools, the construction of local connecting roads, equipment and entertainment of libraries, sports sites and other public utilities. Samtgemeinden can take over other tasks of the member municipalities, for instance, tourism.

== Etymology ==
The term Samtgemeinde (plural: Samtgemeinden) is a neologism consisting of the German adjectives gesamt (whole, entire, all, complete, total, aggregate, collective, overall, general, joint, united) or zusammen (together, jointly) and the noun Gemeinde (municipality). Samtgemeinde can be translated into English as "joint municipal association" or "collective municipal association" but one-to-one translation is hardly possible.

The term Sammtgemeinden (at that time written with double m) was originally used for low-level administrative units in Prussia during a short-lived reform that saw the reorganization of parishes between 1850 and 1853.

== Organs ==
Samtgemeinden have three organs:

- The Samtgemeinde mayor (German: Samtgemeindebürgermeister), elected directly every five years.
- The Samtgemeinde council, (German: Samtgemeinderat) elected every five years.
- The Samtgemeinde committee (German: Samtgemeindeausschuss).

The Samtgemeinde committee consists of the Samtgemeinde mayor (the chairman of the committee), and according to size of the council from four to ten assistants and the council can decide a rise by two (§56 paragraph 2 local government law). These positions are distributed among the factions and groups in the council according to the largest remainder method.
