= Glen Searle =

Australian town planner, researcher and educator

- Born: Whyalla, South Australia

Glen Searle is an Australian town planner, researcher and educator. He is an Honorary Associate Professor at The University of Queensland and at the University of Sydney. He is known for his planning research and work with British and New South Wales governments. He was engaged in strategic planning and policy formulation at a senior level in the NSW Department of Planning between 1981 and 1991. His papers have been published in Planning Theory, Urban Studies, International Journal of Urban and Regional Research, and Geographical Research.

Searle served as the Editor-in-Chief of Urban Policy and Research journal from 2004 to 2014. He is a fellow of the Planning Institute of Australia.

== Education and early career ==
Searle was awarded his BA(Hons) from University of Adelaide in 1966. After completing his BA(Hons), he joined the New South Wales Department of Decentralisation & Development as a research officer where he prepared research material and wrote for Development Corporation's Report on Selective Decentralisation and Report on Sandy Hollow/Maryvale Railway Proposal. In 1970, he moved to the New South Wales Treasury as an economic assistant. In 1975, he moved to London and in 1976 joined the United Kingdom Department of Environment where he was a senior research officer.

Searle moved back to Australia in 1979 and joined the Monash University as a junior research fellow and carried out field-based study of the nature and causes of employment change in 120 companies in Melbourne. In 1980, he received his PhD from Macquarie University. His thesis title was 'Factors Affecting Government Location Decisions, with Reference to the NSW Government Decentralisation Program'.

== Later career ==
In 1981, Searle joined the New South Wales Department of Planning as a Town Planner and worked there in different positions until 1991. During this time, he was involved in strategic planning and policy formulation at the department. In 1982, he recommended a strategy for relocation of Government head offices within Sydney, which was adopted by the State Cabinet. In 1991, he left the Department of Planning to join the University of Technology Sydney's Faculty of Design, Architecture and Building as a Senior Lecturer in Urban Planning. He also served as the Director of Planning Program at the University from 1998 to 2001 and then again from 2004 to 2009.

Searle left University of Technology, Sydney in 2009 to join University of Queensland as Associate Professor in Urban Planning. In 2015, he became Honorary Associate Professor at the university.

Searle served as the Editor-in-Chief of Urban Policy and Research journal from 2004 to 2014. He is a fellow of the Planning Institute of Australia.

=== Work ===
Searle’s main work and research focus is on metropolitan strategic planning, and its housing, transport and economic dimensions. He has shown that Australia’s metropolitan strategic plans are globally distinctive in terms of state control over their outcomes. He has analysed Sydney’s planning for urban intensification in a number of publications, notably in an article proposing five factors that set limits on such intensification. He pioneered analysis of the planning implications of the privatisation of transport infrastructure provision in Sydney. His published research has also tracked outcomes of the rise of neoliberal ideology on Sydney’s strategic plans and on economic development policies within Sydney. At the Department of Planning, Searle worked on a planning balance sheet analysis that identified the North West sector as the preferred new growth direction for Sydney from the 1990s, and on a 1989 report that concluded Sydney could expand to 8 million people at then-current densities without running out of development land in the Sydney basin.

Searle's research also has a focus on the nature of urban and regional economic and employment change. He has written on the likely nature and locations of changes in job structure and workforce in Sydney and has authored publications relating to the location of high tech industries in Sydney, planning for science parks in Sydney, and the impact of technological change on industrial land use. He has published an edited book, two journal papers and two book chapters on the structure, cluster dynamics and agglomeration economics of the Sydney and Melbourne IT industry, arising from an Australian Research Council Discovery grant (2007-2009).

His research on the planning of the year 2000 Sydney Olympic Games analysed the causes of the ‘white elephant’ outcome of the main stadium built for the Games in a widely cited 2002 article.

Searle was responsible for forecasting employment and work force for small areas within Sydney for the years 2021 and 2050 for the report on Future City, Sydney 2050: Town Planning Scenario for the Sydney Water Board in 1993. This followed similar responsibility for small area work force and employment forecasts for modelling of land use-transport interactions for the 1988 Sydney metropolitan strategy.

Searle wrote a report, published by the Department of Urban Affairs and Planning and the Department of State Development, Sydney as a Global City in 1996. This looked at the nature of Sydney's global city role and the planning implications of this, and also examined approaches to planning for a global role in major overseas cities.

== Selected publications ==
=== Books ===
- Sydney as a Global City (1996)
- Sydney's Urban Consolidation Experience: Power, Politics and Community (2007)
- The Economic Geography of the IT Industry in the Asia Pacific Region (2013)
- Compulsory Property Acquisition for Urban Densification (2018)
- Global Planning Innovations for Urban Sustainability (2019)

=== Articles ===
- The Role of the State in Capitalist Development: The Example of Non-Metropolitan New South Wales, Antipode 1981
- Changes in Producer Services Location, Sydney: Globalisation, Technology and Labour, Asia Pacific Viewpoint 1998
- State Powers, State Land and Competition for Global Entertainment: The Case of Sydney, International Journal of Urban and Regional Research 1999
- New Roads, New Rail Lines, New Profits: Privatisation and Sydney's Recent Transport Development, Urban Policy and Research 1999
- Uncertain Legacy: Sydney’s Olympic Stadiums, European Planning Studies 2002
- The Demise of Place Equity in Sydney’s Economic Development Planning, Australian Geographer 2002
- The Limits to Urban Consolidation, Australian Planner 2004
- Metropolitan Strategic Planning: An Australian Paradigm?, Planning Theory 2010
- Planning Context and Urban Intensification Outcomes: Sydney versus Toronto, Urban Studies 2011
- Australian Mega Transport Business Cases: Missing Costs and Benefits, Urban Policy and Research 2019
