= TranSAFE-Alp =

TranSAFE-Alp is a transnational European project funded by the Alpine Space Programme. The project's goal is the setup of a GIS platform intended for the coordination of transnational actions to be taken after disasters, e.g. proposals for diversion routes and coordination of rescue forces. TranSAFE-Alp was launched in September 2011 and lasts until August 2013. The project is headed by the region of Veneto.
