= Land-use conflict =

A land-use conflict occurs when there are conflicting views on land-use policies, such as when an increasing population creates competitive demands for the use of the land, causing a negative impact on other land uses nearby.

== Common types ==
=== Urban ===
One of the most extensively studied urban land-use conflicts is that of highways and car infrastructure generally. Because urban areas concentrate large numbers of people in close proximity, the noise and air of one single vehicle is multiplied by the population density within range of the vehicle. The multiplicative effects of density means cars typically represent the most prominent land-use conflict in medium and large urban areas. Heavy road traffic also causes traffic congestion, affecting many nearby residents and increasing pollution of microplastics and wasting time. Besides transportation, industrial land-use represents the next most significant source of urban land conflict. Urban factories have been the target of urban land-use reforms ever since the first factories were built in 1700s England.

Urban planning was poor or non-existent in the past. Both residential and industrial areas require convenient transport. Labour-intensive industries need to seek workers easily. As a result, residential and industrial areas are often close neighbours.

In developing cities or particularly old urban areas, this type of conflict is a common sight. In downtown Los Angeles, however, the problem is opposite. Industrial facilities are being converted to residential use, and the Community Redevelopment Agency of Los Angeles believes that this trend will cause a loss of job opportunities for unskilled workers.

=== Suburban ===
Complaints about noise and odour emitted by agricultural land uses are rather common in places between the urban and rural areas and may cause the premature removal of land from agricultural use. Urban owners often complain that the odour or noise were not apparent at the time when the house was purchased. Producers argue that these differences occurred because of the weather conditions, and do not mean that they had changed what they were doing. Most farms have, in fact, in some ways reduced their odour. Moreover, spraying may cause a lot of noise, disturbing the nearby residents. As farmers often work at night-time or early in the morning, residents complain that the noise is disturbing their sleep.

Another major concern in such areas is the traffic. Heavy farming materials as well as materials for home construction are heavy and bulky, and therefore move somewhat slowly and cause traffic congestions. Crime in such fringes, particularly trespassing and vandalism, are also common, and affect both landowners and the producers.

=== Rural ===
Such conflicts are, however, not restricted to urban areas. For example, car repairing workshops and cargo container storages located near the residential suburbs can trigger land-use conflicts by raising the risk of fire and polluting the nearby environment. For example, oil from the car repairing workshops can cause water pollution.

== Solutions ==
There are a number of possible methods to ease, avoid or eradicate land-use conflicts. The most common ones are listed below:

- Urban planning

Urban planning is the planning of land uses. This helps to separate lands uses that do not complement each other. For example, a green belt may be used to separate residential areas from factories.

- Redevelopment

Redeveloping old urban areas by planning the land uses carefully so that land is used in a better way than before. This will improve the quality of the environment of that area.

- Restriction of land use

Sometimes, unauthorized changes in the land use of a particular area would be outlawed. In other words, the land use of a particular area must remain the one set by the government. Again using Hong Kong as an example, flats may not be used for commercial, industrial or other purposes. This prevents any ill effects a change in land use may cause. However, some places allow one land user to develop whereas denying such a right to others, causing wealth distribution problems to arise.

- Development of new towns

New towns are towns in which the urban planning is better than that of old urban areas. In these towns, all factories are grouped into a certain place which is away from the residential blocks, often with green belts, so the pollution has a smaller chance of affecting the residents. Consequently, people would have both a good living environment and an ideal working environment. Again using Hong Kong as an example, only 1% of the land use in Sha Tin is mixed.

- Reclamation

Reclamation helps solve land-use conflicts indirectly by easing the demand for land and lowering the land price.

- Tort law

== See also ==
- Land use – Classification of land resources based on what can be built and on its use
- Land-use planning – Process of regulating the use of land by a central authority
- Nuisance – Common law tort causing inconvenience or damage
- Urban planning – Technical process of land use and urban design
- Zoning – Government policy allowing certain uses of land in different places
