= Inter-municipal cooperation =

Inter-municipal cooperation (IMC) is a generic term for all joint provision of public services between municipalities, who are normally but not necessarily neighbours.

Municipalities are elements of administration and have a history of several hundred years in Europe. One speaks of IMC when two or more municipalities work together to provide a public service, where cooperation ranges from coordinated behaviour to joint ventures. As territorial consolidation often fails because of political resistance, inter-municipal cooperation is a way to keep public services efficient and effective without territorial consolidation. However, IMC can have high failure rates when coordination problems between municipalities in steering and monitoring cannot be resolved. Unfortunately, coordination can be hard to achieve due to the multiple principal problem that exists in inter-municipal cooperation. In addition, its cost-efficiency can be limited.

== History ==
Cooperation of municipalities is a contemporary phenomenon. A historic example of inter-municipal cooperation is the Hanseatic League, created by municipalities in Northern Europe and lasted from the 13th to the 17th century. Following the Industrial Revolution, as cities grew rapidly and the requirements concerning public services increased, inter-municipal cooperation became increasingly popular. While cooperation was initially without obligation, with the beginning of the 20th century IMC was increasingly legally codified.

== Benefits and Barriers ==
=== Benefits ===
IMC is used to increase efficiency and effectiveness in providing public services. The joint financing and operating of these services can cut costs and achieve economies of scale and scope, which becomes increasingly important in smaller and more rural municipalities. IMC can also allow capital investment that would be unaffordable otherwise, and eliminates duplicate efforts. A major advantage in Europe is that the European Union is providing incentives for municipal partnerships.

=== Barriers ===
The most important barrier for inter-municipal cooperation is lack of trust or coordination between the partners, and if these cannot be overcome, failure rates of IMC can be high. Unfortunately, coordination is hard to achieve. Inter-municipal cooperation, especially in an institutional form where municipalities together govern an organization for service delivery, invokes a multiple principal problem that makes steering and monitoring the organization difficult and reduces the efficiency and accountability of that party. Politicians and citizens may (rightfully) fear a loss of control over the service. Besides the lack of trust, the often complicated legal structure of IMC can be a barrier. Citizens may also worry that cooperation is a step towards consolidation or amalgamation.

== Types of Inter-municipal Cooperation ==
=== Coordinated Behaviour ===
Coordinated behaviour is the lowest level of inter-municipal cooperation. Both entry and exit are voluntary and non-binding. Typical examples for coordinated behaviour are combined strategies for tourist development.

=== Public Contract ===
Public contracts are more binding than a coordinated behaviour. The costs for the formation of this cooperation are low as only the legal consulting may result noteworthy costs. However, failure rates can be high when contracts are incomplete. This kind of cooperation is typically chosen when the service is similar for each of the participants, like one town settles the snow plowing service for one or more other towns and receives a certain amount of money in return. Such inter-municipal contracting is particularly common in the United States.

=== Administration Unit / Special District ===
In this model, the participants of the intermunicipal cooperation found and own the administration unit or special district. They transfer the right to provide the public service to the newly formed unit. As well as the service, the unit will have the right to raise the fees for this service, if such fees were previously raised by the participating municipalities. As these units need clear defined rights and obligation the effort to form them is much higher, and they are not possible in all countries. Disposal services and water supply may be organised in this fashion in some countries.

=== Private Limited Company ===
Private law units such as companies or foundations can be used as well. Some countries, so as Germany, allow the municipals the ownership of private companies only if the purpose of the company is an economical not a public service. The easiest way to form a company by private law is the private limited company. It is easy and fast to found and the liability is limited to the assets of the company. However, while research shows such cooperation can be effective and efficient, the complexity of contracts in such arrangements can also lead to high failure rates.

=== Public Limited Company ===
To organise an intermunicipal cooperation with a public law unit such as a public limited company is one of the least used possibilities. Although the PLC shares the advantages of the Private Limited like limited liability the higher administration and financial effort makes the PLC rather unattractive for IMC. Besides that the PLC is often very difficult to control by the owners what rules is almost out for IMC. Just like private limited companies, public limited companies may have a high complexity of contracts that can also lead to high failure rates.

== Phases of implementing IMC ==
The phases to implement an IMC can be divided in up to 14 phases. Usually it is enough to distinguish four phases: the analysis of the needs, the analysis of the effects, the implementation and the evaluation.

At first one has to perform a needs assessment to find the areas in which IMC can benefit the participants. What is needed is an exact specification of the goals the IMC should achieve. The parties have to realize what they want and make sure that the partner has similar goals. Especially in the area of public services, where there is a constant dialogue with citizens about these services, it is important to make the process and the goals as transparent as possible. Citizens can be involved in the process of forming the IMC by using workshops or panel discussions.

After that, a feasibility study is needed to analyse the economic, operational and administrative efforts and benefits. If the service to be organised as an IMC already exists, it needs to be exactly specified. All the facts flow into the negotiation of the agreement, whether it is a contract, an administrative unit or a private company. At this point the involved parties should be clear about the form of financing the IMC. It can be advisable to seek legal advice as IMC can become legally very difficult in some countries.

When everything is fixed in contracts the participants can start to realise the project. As well as in the first phase of the IMC implementation it is important to communicate the process to all involved parties. Especially when problems arise, transparent behaviour is needed to sustain trust between the involved parties.

After the successful implementation of the project, the parties should negotiate certain progress of improvement an adjustment to changing environmental conditions. It is advisable to establish the “change management” in the contract between the involved parties. There should be a periodical evaluation of the IMC so that changed prerequisites will be noticed.

== By country ==
=== Belgium ===
By a framework decree of 2001, inter-municipal cooperation was reformed by the Flemish Government. A variety of forms of inter-municipal cooperation were legally implemented. Beside that certain elements of supervision were implemented, to ensure control by the municipal councils. The framework insists on the "purity" of IMC, so municipalities shall be involved primarily.

=== Finland ===
Especially in the thinly populated Finland inter-municipal cooperation has been an effective tool to ensure public services at reasonable cost. Finnish local governments are self-governing with a large variety of responsibilities. Due to this fact the services provided by the municipals are numerous. Even service competition between municipals is quite common in Finland.

=== France ===
France was essentially governed by a central state, but within the last century municipal authorities have gained increasing autonomy. Nevertheless, inter-municipal cooperation is often performed on a voluntary basis. As discussion of other larger-scale, regional, consolidation is politically hazardous in France, IMC (intercommunalité) is becoming an important factor to help maintain public services at reasonable cost.

=== Germany ===
Inter-municipal cooperation has a long history in Germany. In the administrative system of Germany (State, Federal States, Communities) the municipals have to finance their services themselves. Therefore, municipals have a natural interest in providing public services efficiently.

=== United Kingdom ===
In contrast to other European Countries local governments are highly restricted in the United Kingdom. Therefore, inter-municipal cooperation is not that common in the UK. Although municipalities have the authority to perform public services they often do not have the possibility to raise additional fees.

=== United States ===
There are 39,000 local governments United States and 22,000 have under 2,500 inhabitants. Besides providing public services themselves, municipalities in the USA have used privatization (contracting out) and cooperation with neighbouring municipalities for a long period of time. Cooperation is used to maintain independent identities and still achieve economies of scale. Most of the cooperative ventures are single-function (education, water, housing, transport).

== See also ==
- Inter-municipal land use planning
- Intercommunalité en France
- Interkommunale Zusammenarbeit
