= Alliance in the Alps =

Association of municipalities and regions of the Alpine region

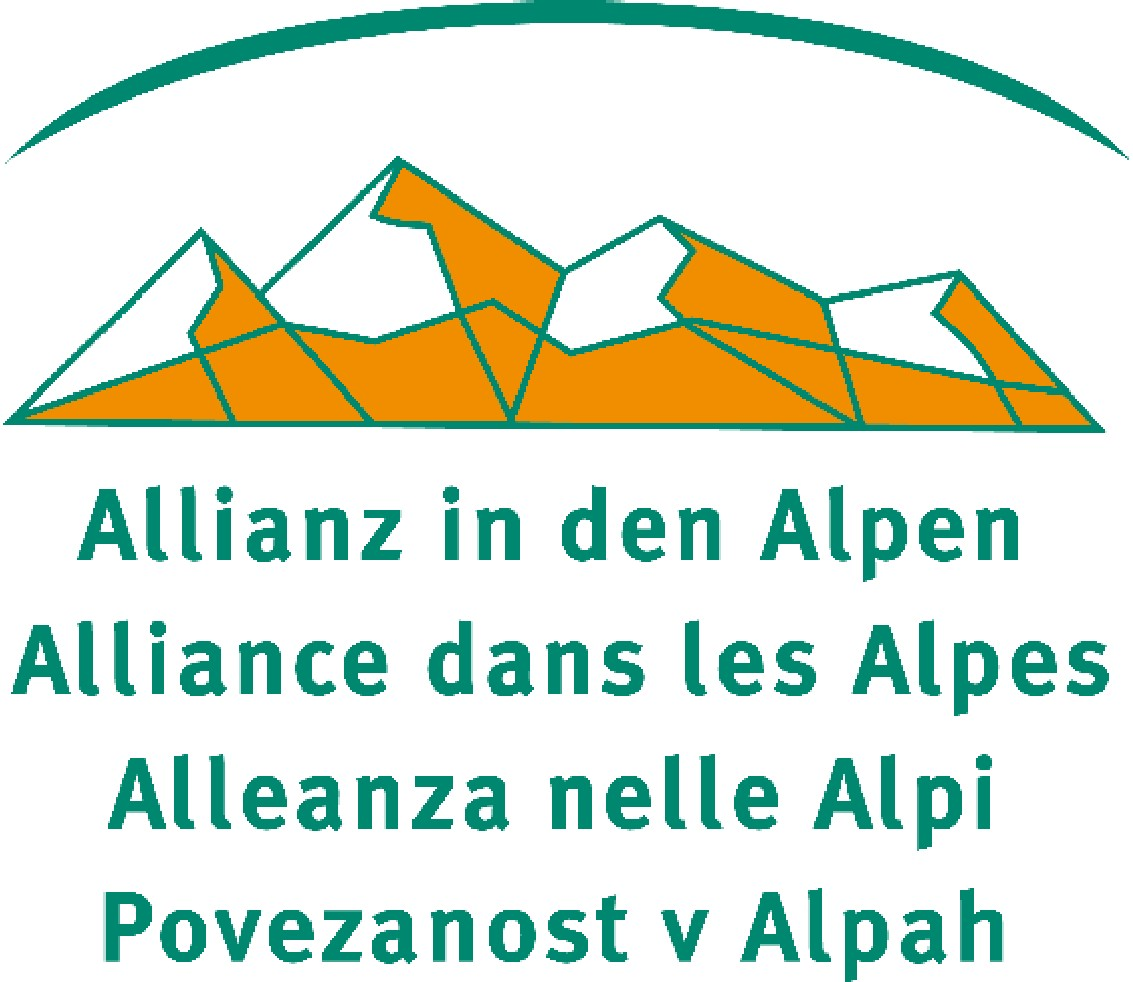
- Founded: 1997
- Type: Non-governmental organization
- Purpose: sustainable development
- Location: Mäder, Austria
- Region served: Alps
- Method: Information, exchange of experience
- Members: 316 municipalities
- Key people: Rainer Siegele (President), Marc Nitschke (Vice president), Freddy Kaiser, Jure Žerjav, Pierre Balme, Antonio Chiadò, Franz Gnos (members of the committee)
- Website: www.alpenallianz.org

The network of communities Alliance in the Alps is an association of currently more than 300 local authorities and regions from seven Alpine states and was founded in 1997. On the basis of the targets set by the Alpine Convention, its members, together with their citizens, work to develop their alpine living environment in a sustainable way. "Exchange – Address – Implement" is the guiding principle behind the Alliance's activities.

The network of communities offers a sharing of experience and information beyond the boundaries of language and culture. All the publications and events are in four languages: German, French, Italian and Slovene.

== Activities ==
Alliance in the Alps promotes the exchange of knowledge and experience, threw setting up events and excursions at local, regional or international level. It also plans to formulate policy positions for a sustainable and environmentally approach to climate change by municipalities. The annual report is published in the four main languages of the alpine space, and a newsletter "Flashinfo" is sent by email quarterly.

== Members ==
The network is currently counting 316 municipalities members in seven countries: Germany, Austria, France, Italy, Liechtenstein, Slovenia, Switzerland . A membership requires the assent to the principles and goals of the Alpine Convention. Afterwards, the members also have to implement sustainable goals, to develop measure programs protecting the environment, and to constantly improve the environmental protection.

== Projects ==
=== dynAlp-climate ===
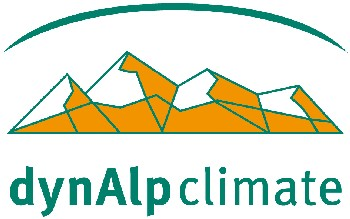

Climate changes are currently the focus of many actors. Unfortunately the measures adopted in some cases disagree with the principle of sustainable development and are opposite to nature conservation. That's why the network of municipalities believes it is so important to support its members in embracing a sustainable approach to the problem of climate change.

Focussing on climate changes, the new dynAlp-climate program is running from 2009 to 2012. It has a budget of around 800,000 euros, due to the financial support from the MAVA Foundation for Nature. The financial assistance is intended for projects in municipalities or regions which are providing a contribution to climate protection and adaptation to climate change impacts.

In parallel with the municipal projects, group events such as workshops, excursions and international meetings are a key activity of dynAlp-climate as well. These help to increase networking between the alpine municipalities and thus help to make local knowledge accessible to a large public.

=== DYNALP2 ===
With the DYNALP² project (2006–2009), "Alliance in the Alps" carried on the work on sustainable development and implementation of the Alpine Convention. DYNALP² implements the findings from CIPRA’s Future in the Alps Project" at the community level and promotes exchanges between the municipalities. DYNALP² projects focus on one or more of the following topic areas: regional added value, governance capacity, protected areas, mobility, new forms of decision making, and policies and instruments.

=== DYNALP ===
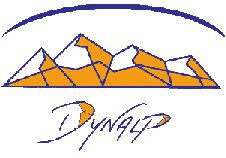

Launched in 2003, DYNALP was an INTERREG IIIB "Alpine space" project supported by the EU. With a total budget of 2.16 million euros for a period of three years, it helped to fund the development, coordination and implementation of 52 community or regional projects for the following four protocols of the Alpine Convention: Tourism, Conservation of Nature and the Countryside, Mountain Farming and Regional Planning and Sustainable Development. In addition to projects in communes, sharing experiences across borders language and culture was the most important goal of DYNALP.

== Coopération ==
The "Alliance of Central Asian Mountain Communities" was founded in June 2003 in the Tadjik capital Dushanbe on the model of the "Alliance in the Alps" network. Like its sister organisation in the Alps, this Central Asian community network is active in the area of sustainable development in mountain communities and knowledge-sharing at the community level. With an agenda of mutual visits, excursions and information-exchange, the organisation became as well a platform for good practice and interesting projects.
