= Land-use planning =

Process of regulating the use of land by a central authority

Land use planning or land-use regulation is the process of regulating the use of land by a central authority. Usually, this is done to promote more desirable social and environmental outcomes as well as a more efficient use of resources. More specifically, the goals of modern land use planning often include environmental conservation, restraint of urban sprawl, minimization of transport costs, prevention of land use conflicts, and a reduction in exposure to pollutants. In the pursuit of these goals, planners assume that regulating the use of land will change the patterns of human behavior, and that these changes are beneficial. The first assumption, that regulating land use changes the patterns of human behavior is widely accepted. However, the second assumption – that these changes are beneficial – is contested, and depends on the location and regulations being discussed.

In urban planning, land use planning seeks to order and regulate land use in an efficient and ethical way, thus preventing land use conflicts. Governments use land use planning to manage the development of land within their jurisdictions. In doing so, the governmental unit can plan for the needs of the community while safeguarding natural resources. To this end, it is the systematic assessment of land and water potential, alternatives for land use, and economic and social conditions in order to select and adopt the best land use options. Often one element of a comprehensive plan, a land use plan provides a vision for the future possibilities of development in neighborhoods, districts, cities, or any defined planning area.

In the United States, the terms land use planning, regional planning, urban planning, and urban design are often used interchangeably, and will depend on the state, county, and/or project in question. Despite confusing nomenclature, the essential function of land use planning remains the same whatever term is applied. The Canadian Institute of Planners offers a definition that land use planning means the scientific, aesthetic, and orderly disposition of land, resources, facilities and services with a view to securing the physical, economic and social efficiency, health and well-being of urban and rural communities. The American Planning Association states that the goal of land use planning is to further the welfare of people and their communities by creating convenient, equitable, healthful, efficient, and attractive environments for present and future generations. Land-use planning in England and Wales is founded on the Town and Country Planning Act 1947, with comparable legislation applicable in Scotland and Northern Ireland.

== History ==
Land use planning nearly always requires land use regulation, which typically encompasses zoning. Zoning regulates the types of activities that can be accommodated on a given piece of land, as well as the amount of space devoted to those activities, and the ways that buildings may be situated and shaped.

The ambiguous nature of the term "planning", as it relates to land use, is historically tied to the practice of zoning. Zoning in the United States came about in the late 19th and early 20th centuries to protect the interests of property owners. The practice was found to be constitutionally sound by the Supreme Court decision of Village of Euclid v. Ambler Realty Co. in 1926. Soon after, the model law known as the Standard State Zoning Enabling Act was enacted by many state legislatures, which gave authority to the states and its subdivisions to regulate land use. Even so, the practice remains controversial today, particularly in its impact on economic and racial segregation, as some critics argue that zoning has often been used to exclude certain populations from particular neighborhoods.

The "taking clause" of the Fifth Amendment to the United States Constitution prohibits the government from taking private property for public use without just compensation. The case of Dolan v. City of Tigard demonstrated the criteria that determine the threshold of what is considered taking. One interpretation of the taking clause is that any restriction on the development potential of land through zoning regulation is a "taking". A deep-rooted anti-zoning sentiment exists in America, that no one has the right to tell another what he can or cannot do with his land. Ironically, although people are often averse to being told how to develop their own land, they tend to expect the government to intervene when a proposed land use is undesirable.

Conventional zoning has not typically regarded the manner in which buildings relate to one another or the public spaces around them, but rather has provided a pragmatic system for mapping jurisdictions according to permitted land use. This system, combined with the interstate highway system, widespread availability of mortgage loans, growth in the automobile industry, and the over-all post-World War II economic expansion, destroyed most of the character that gave distinctiveness to American cities. The urban sprawl that most US cities began to experience in the mid-twentieth century was, in part, created by a flat approach to land use regulations. Zoning without planning created unnecessarily exclusive zones. Thoughtless mapping of these zones over large areas was a big part of the recipe for suburban sprawl. It was from the deficiencies of this practice that land use planning developed, to envision the changes that development would cause and mitigate the negative effects of such change.

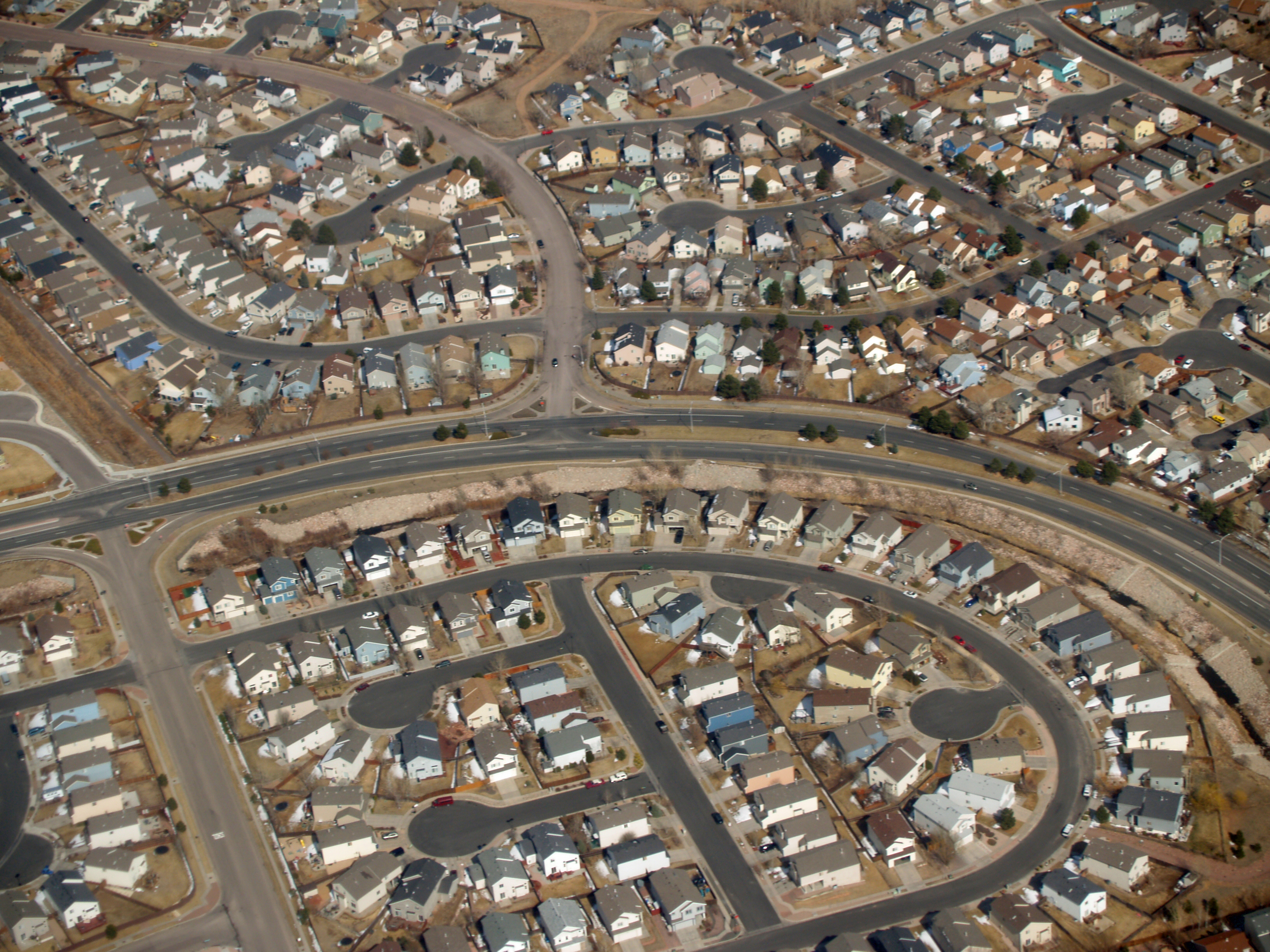
Suburban development near Colorado Springs, Colorado, United States

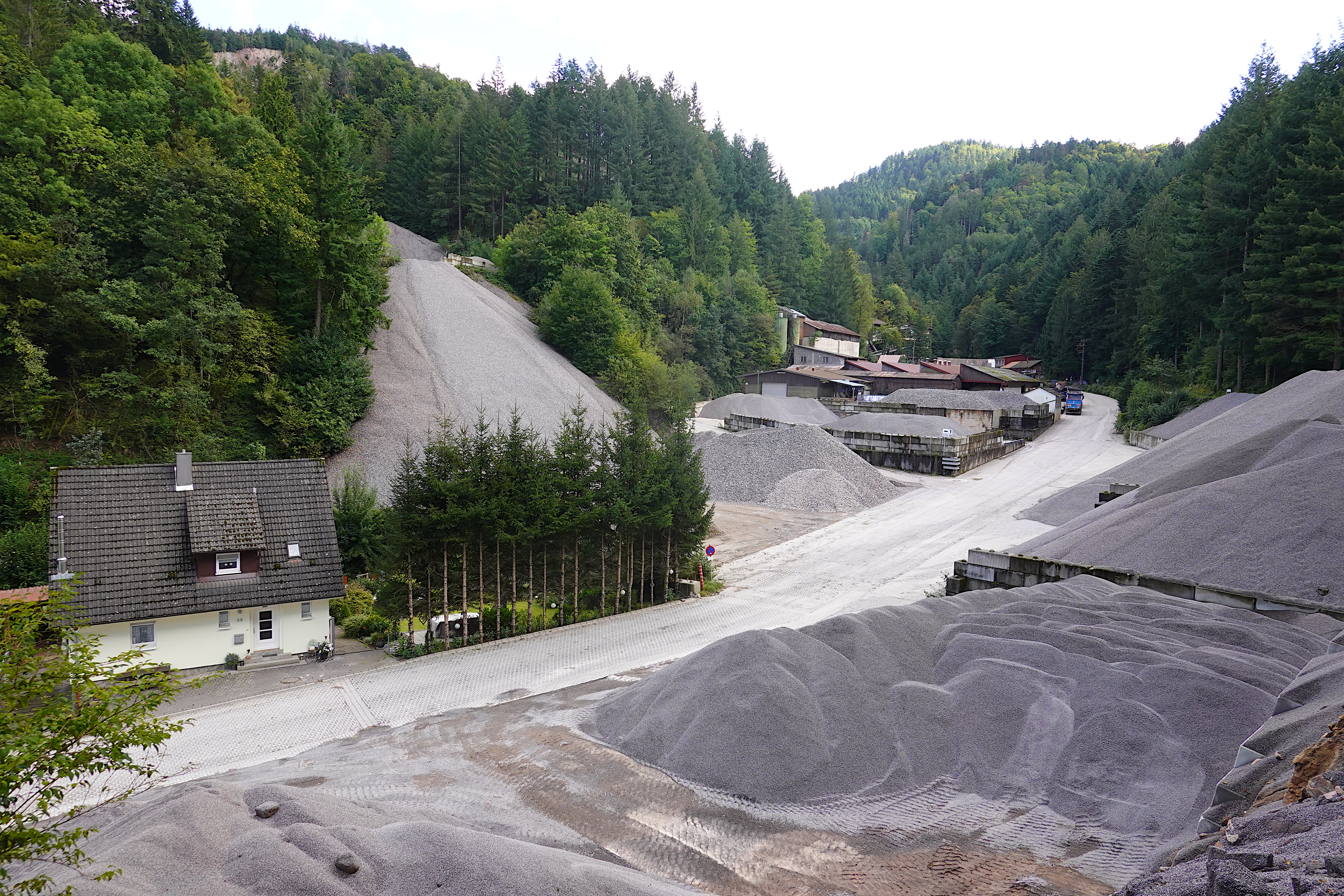
Gravel quarry at Ottenhoefen im Schwarzwald, Germany. Residential and industrial usage abut with no buffer zone.

As America grew and urban sprawl was rampant, the much-loved America of the older towns, cities, or streetcar suburbs essentially became illegal through zoning. Unparalleled growth and unregulated development changed the look and feel of landscapes and communities. They strained commercial corridors and affected housing prices, causing citizens to fear a decline in the social, economic and environmental attributes that defined their quality of life. Zoning regulations became politically contentious as developers, legislators, and citizens struggled over altering zoning maps in a way that was acceptable to all parties. Land use planning practices evolved as an attempt to overcome these challenges. It engages citizens and policy-makers to plan for development with more intention, foresight, and community focus than had been previously used.

== Description and application ==
=== Description ===
Land use planning is defined as: the process by which optimum forms of land use and management are indicated, considering the biophysical, technological, social, economic and political conditions of a particular territory. The objective of planning land use is to influence, control or direct changes in the use of land so that it is dedicated to the most beneficial use and maintains the quality of the environment and promoting conservation of the land resources. The territorial diagnosis and the generation of alternatives of management and environmental protection for the planning of the use of the land produces the indispensable knowledge necessary for the formulation of the policies of use, contributing to the search of competitive and sustainable productive and extractive activities and systems. The methodological process of land use planning contributes to: orienting the location of economic and social activities regarding the aptitude of the land and providing solutions to conflicts of use; indicate the base of natural resources that should remain and protected areas; point out the areas exposed to natural hazards and their management; identify sustainable productive and extractive activities and systems; guide the planning of land uses and indicate the areas that require land adaptation or recovery projects.

=== Planning process and parties involved ===
In most countries, the local municipal council/local government, the body responsible of the environment and oftentimes the national government assume all the functions of land use planning; among them the corresponding function to territorial ordering (OT). For this reason, the highlighted bodies have among other responsibilities the promotion of the conservation and sustainable use of natural resources, establishing policies, criteria, tools and procedures of the most appropriate efficient and sustainable territorial order in coordination with any other relevant corresponding entities such as construction companies and the public.

=== Application ===
- "Developing cities and towns": land use planning is an important component of city planning. The nature of cities required to the most beneficial use in terms of maximization of economic factors and promoting convenience, while maintaining the quality of the environment and promoting conservation of the land. The only way to achieve this is the utilization of the elements of land use planning.
- "The concept of Zoning": Zoning is the process by which areas of land are split into zones by appropriate establishments within which several users are assigned to each zone. Therefore, this makes zoning very important modus operandi in land use planning where it is used to design urban areas in many countries (Lewis-Roger, 1987). The topic of zoning is considered within the context of land use planning and design as a systemic perception. Zoning is used as a fundamental component of territorial planning, which is incorporated in the stages of the logical model of regional development. In the process of zoning, the actor divides land into units of different sizes, shapes and locations, according to the characteristics of the terrain and the corporality of a culture. The actor who generates a multiplicity of spaces using zoning, based on global spatial unit and the preferences of user who uses these spaces in multiple use form, decomposes his vision of it into four different dimensions namely; deontic, cognitive, expressive and aesthetics functions. Each of these dimensions represents land in different forms, intensities, positions and areas, which may not coincide with each other. The deontic space is that of the transforming actions of the world, of the duty to be and to do. The cognitive space is apprehended by the faculties of knowledge from the senses to the reason, such as the ecological and technological spaces. The aesthetic space refers to the scopes of feel and beauty. The expressive or indexical space corresponds to the internal and cultural expression of the identity of the person who organizes the space. Often, a fifth space is included, that is, the administrative space, which concerns the positioning of the legal, authoritative and legislative base being planned. Zoning should not be considered as the end in itself, but only as a means of approximation in relation to geographical reality. Instead of imposing pre-established categories, it is about looking for landscape discontinuities. The category system (taxonomy) must allow a deepening (level) of the landscapes according to their scale. For each order of phenomena there are thresholds of manifestation and "extinction" that by themselves can justify the systematic differentiation of landscapes into hierarchical units. The study and zoning of the coverage and land use requires first defining the concepts of land, coverage and use in order to avoid the problems of interpretation associated with the management of these concepts. The concept of land is defined as an entity formed by the mutual interaction of living and non-living nature in a recognizable portion of the Earth's surface. It is a more geographical than edaphological definition. The earth is conceived as the result of the integration of biophysical and socioeconomic elements whose interrelation generates certain particular spatial units or landscapes, therefore, land and landscape are considered in this guide as synonyms. Land cover, on the other hand, is defined as the different features that cover the land, such as water, forest, other types of vegetation, bare rocks or sand, man-made structures, etc. In general, these are the traits that can be directly observed in aerial photographs and frequently in satellite images. The concept of use, applies to the employment that man gives to different types of coverage, cyclically or permanently to meet his material or spiritual needs. Basically, this is where the need for zoning arises.

=== Conditions necessary ===
1. Community relations: for any land planning activity, the actors involved must involve the community or the public to put into consideration their opinions on the proposed land planning initiatives. After all, the land is being planned so that the public can enjoy the benefits that comes from land use planning.
2. Government and legal support: the government can support land use planning initiatives in a myriad of ways. The first is by financing or subsidizing a section of land use planning activities. The second way is by reducing bureaucracy and administration bottlenecks that comes with obtaining permits and licences.

== Pros and cons ==
=== Pros ===
- Land use planning is useful as a framework for growth; Growing urban areas can implement top-down visions through regulations placed on how growth is shaped. Cities need to plan for the future, and controlling the usage of land is especially important during periods of intense urbanization. Cities in countries or regions undergoing industrialization have the greatest need for land-use standardization, as the rapid growth of infrastructure, the built environment, and industrial capacity can create significant problems when not planned comprehensively.
- Good land use planning positively impacts the development of urban economy.
- Effective Land use planning compliments ecological protection as a support for the conservation of and sustainable use of natural resources and biological diversity. Policies such as a green belt or an urban growth boundary both are common methods used in cities across the world to protect rural or agricultural land from exurban development.
- Mechanisms to prevent the settlement of populations and the development of socioeconomic activities are promoted in areas with high potential for risks in the face of natural and anthropogenic hazards.

=== Cons ===
- Land use regulation is frequently too strict, and makes the supply of land too inelastic, causing prices to rise dramatically. Starting in the 2000s, North American urban cores experienced a reversal of suburbanization patterns seen from 1940 to 1980, however due to a system of overly prescriptive land use regulations, many cities, such as Los Angeles, Toronto, or Boston, have been unable to build enough housing to meet demand.
- Systems of land use regulation implemented by different governments with different goals often interact with unpredictable results. Many regulations remain unchanged and unquestioned for decades because the complexity of the problem is so large. In North America, systems of land use planning have exacerbated the housing crises experienced in the 2010s and 2020s.
- No single party can rationally decide every detail of how land is used from the top down at the scale of thousands or millions of buildings. A bottom-up system of management, usually landownership, is required to optimize for locational efficiency at a micro level.
- The cost of land use planning is usually high, generally because of poor investment and the lack of anticipation of technology.
- Land use planning theory has largely been shaped by case studies of cities in the Global North. Countries all over the world, particularly in the Global South, are seeing population booms and rapid urbanization. Many of the methods, practices, and assumptions about land use planning from 20th Century Europe and the United States are not relevant to the Global South, where conditions are quite different. Many fundamental concepts associated with traditional land use planning, like zoning, have persisted despite a rapidly-changing urban landscape.
- Fragmented land-use planning codes can reduce construction productivity.

== Land use planning and environmental sustainability ==
In view of sustainable development, land use planning is seen as a political and technical-administrative decision-making process agreed with social, economic, political and technical factors, for orderly occupation and sustainable use of the land under development. On the other hand, it seeks regulation and promotion of the location and sustainable development of human settlements, economic and social activities, and spatial physical development, based on the identification of potentialities and limitations that consider environmental, economic, sociocultural, institutional and geopolitical criteria. By and large, these parameters are put in place in order to make sure that the environment is protected during land use or land development. Indeed, based on the recommendations of the United Nations in its Habitat conference, land is assigned a high importance for the development of human life as it is the fundamental support for its permanence and development, this being the most important objective of the policy of human settlements. That is, the land resource is recognized as an essential element, which supports the social, political and economic formation of society. As mentioned earlier, the use of land refers to the occupation of a certain area according to its agrological capacity and therefore its development potential, it is classified according to its location as urban or rural, it represents a fundamental element for the development of the city and its inhabitants since it is from these that its urban structure is formed and therefore its functionality is defined. For this reason, there is a need to ensure sustainability in order to ensure the we continue to enjoy the benefits that come from urban planning and to ensure that future generations will continue enjoying these benefits.

To guarantee this, land use planning come into the fold. In a broader sense, this is a tool through which State defines the type of use land will have within a settlement, e.g. a city, while also determining the guidelines for its use in order to ensure effectiveness and sustainability. Land use, in this case, is assigned on the basis on its physical and functional characteristics that they have in the urban structure, and with the aim of occupying the space in an orderly manner and according to their physical capacity (occupation of areas suitable for urban development and environmental sustainability), which finally it translates into a harmonious growth of the city. This tool is structured through a planning system at the national and local level, which establishes the general guidelines that should be taken into account for the development of urban development. Here, the authorities involved might formulate a number of restrictions to guarantee sustainability, for example, banning land development in riparian zones or in national parks. Basically, the goal here is to protect the environment.

Throughout the world, there are rising levels of environmental degradation due to unclean energy usage in the development and powering of cities and neighborhoods. In the 20th century, there was a global push to develop large cities quickly to accommodate the people who were migrating from rural areas to cities for jobs. The type of energy used for this was either coal or oil fuel, which meant that the environment was disregarded and damaged by numerous urban development projects. Today, the United Nations has found that over half of the world's population lives in cities that are still growing. In order to create environmentally viable urban landscapes, the UN advocated for green energy use, as well as urban development that encouraged green-friendly transportation. In the United States, about 75% of the energy used is allocated to power buildings and modes of transportation; land use planning can be a useful tool in changing these aspects of energy usage in a way that would be beneficial to both residents and the ecology.

A sustainable urban development includes:

- Methods for reducing waste, such as recycling and composting programs that are easily accessible to residents.
- Limiting pollution, with techniques such as protecting universal access to necessities and encouraging access to facilities, goods, and services in ways that do not require the use of a car.
- Encouraging public transportation usage and spread within a city.

The Partnership for Sustainable Communities, created by the U.S. Department of Housing and Urban Development, the U.S. Department Of Transportation, and the U.S. Environmental Protection Agency in 2009 was intended to encourage sustainable land use planning. This partnership helps to ensure that federal housing projects, transportation, and other neighborhood infrastructure would help residents live closer to jobs, while also reducing pollution since there would be less commute time. Over the past decade, this federal partnership has funded 1,066 projects across the 50 States, as well as Washington D.C. and Puerto Rico. The total amount of grant money given to these projects has reached approximately $4.6 billion. Some of the programs that the partnership sponsors are the Housing and Urban Development's "Sustainable Communities Regional Planning" and "Community Challenge Grant Programs". These programs have made important strides in sustainable urban planning, with about 40 percent of U.S. citizens now having access to communities who were awarded these grants. Both of these programs make up $240 million in federal investment towards local land use planning efforts.

== Types of planning ==
Various types of planning have emerged over the course of the 20th century. Below are the six main typologies of planning, as defined by David Walters in his book, Designing Communities (2007):

- Traditional or comprehensive planning: Common in the US after World War II, characterized by politically neutral experts with a rational view of the new urban development. Focused on producing clear statements about the form and content of new development.
- Systems planning: 1950s–1970s, resulting from the failure of comprehensive planning to deal with the unforeseen growth of post World War II America. More analytical view of the planning area as a set of complex processes, less interested in a physical plan.
- Democratic planning: 1960s. Result of societal loosening of class and race barriers. Gave more citizens a voice in planning for future of community.
- Advocacy and equity planning: 1960s & 70s. Strands of democratic planning that sought specifically to address social issues of inequality and injustice in community planning.
- Strategic planning: 1960s-present. Recognizes small-scale objectives and pragmatic real-world constraints.
- Environmental planning: 1960s–present. Developed as many of the ecological and social implications of global development were first widely understood.

Today, successful planning involves a balanced mix of analysis of the existing conditions and constraints; extensive public engagement; practical planning and design; and financially and politically feasible strategies for implementation.

Current processes include a combination of strategic and environmental planning. It is becoming more widely understood that any sector of land has a certain capacity for supporting human, animal, and vegetative life in harmony, and that upsetting this balance has dire consequences on the environment. Planners and citizens often take on an advocacy role during the planning process in an attempt to influence public policy.

Since the 1990s, the activist/environmentalist approach to planning has grown into the Smart Growth movement, characterized by the focus on more sustainable and less environmentally damaging forms of development. Moreover, there is changes on the requirements of land use planning overtime. For example, whilst most of the urban planners suggest the distance from the landfill that a housing estate should be built, they must also take wind direction into consideration.

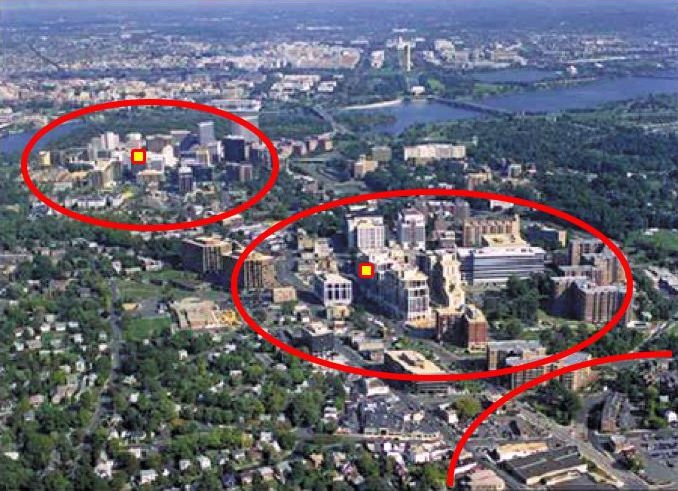
Aerial view of Rosslyn-Ballston corridor in Arlington, Virginia. High density, mixed use development is concentrated within ¼–½ mile from the Rosslyn, Court House and Clarendon Washington Metro stations (shown in red), with limited density outside that area. This photograph is taken from the United States Environmental Protection Agency website describing Arlington's award for overall excellence in smart growth in 2002 — the first ever granted by the agency.

Smart growth supports the integration of mixed land uses into communities as a critical component of achieving better places to live. Putting uses in close proximity to one another has benefits for transportation alternatives to driving, security, community cohesiveness, local economies, and general quality of life issues. Smart growth strives to provide a means for communities to alter the planning context which currently renders mixed land uses illegal in most of the country.

== Methods ==
Professional planners work in the public sector for governmental and non-profit agencies, and in the private sector for businesses related to land, community, and economic development. Through research, design, and analysis of data, a planner's work is to create a plan for some aspect of a community. This process typically involves gathering public input to develop the vision and goals for the community.

A charrette is a facilitated planning workshop often used by professional planners to gather information from their clients and the public about the project at hand. Charettes involve a diverse set of stakeholders in the planning process, to ensure that the final plan comprehensively addresses the study area.

Geographic information systems, or GIS, are very useful and important tools in land use planning. It uses aerial photography to show land parcels, topography, street names, and other pertinent information. GIS systems contain layers of graphic information and their relational databases that may be projected into maps that allow the user to view a composite of a specific area, adding an array of graphically oriented decision-making tools to the planning process.

A transect, as used in planning, is a hierarchical scale of environmental zones that define a land area by its character, ranging from rural, preserved land to urban centers. As a planning methodology, the transect is used as a tool for managing growth and sustainability by planning land use around the physical character of the land. This allows a community to plan for growth while preserving the natural and historical nature of their environment.

Natural ecology and historical identity of the city are matched to its topography in the Urban Landscape System approach that intends to mitigate effects of climate change and improve city branding through the ontology of place.

Another approach to land use planning is the use of "traditional and local knowledge," or TLK, or local, Indigenous, and place-bound ways of knowing. Categories of TLK include 1) knowledge about the environment, 2) knowledge about the current use of areas, 3) knowledge of management systems, 4) values associate with the environment (i.e., spirituality and culture). There is growing literature about how to effectively incorporate and represent TLK in land use and management plans.

== Basis of land use planning authority in the United States ==
Police power is the basis for land use planning authority in the United States. This authority is usually delegated by state governments to local governments, including counties and cities. It is these local governments that most frequently exercise police power in land use planning matters. The regulation of land use based on police power is distinct from the taking of private property by the government through the power of eminent domain. If the regulation of land use is done under the authority of the police power, the private property owner is not typically entitled to compensation as they would be if property was taken under the power of eminent domain. The court decision in the case Commonwealth v. Alger was related to land use planning and dealt with the construction of a wharf on privately owned tidelands around Boston Harbor.

== Practical examples ==
=== Milan ===
Milan city is located in northern Italy. It is the second most populous city in the country after Rome with a population of over 4 million (The CBD and its metropolitan Boroughs).

Every area in Milan is a segment that starts from the center and reaches the city limits, so that central areas and peripheral areas are part of the same area. In Milan, zones are not identified by names but numbers. The city hall area 1 of Milan includes the entire historical center, starting from the geographical center of Milan in Piazza Duomo up to the Cerchia dei Bastioni. The town hall area 2 goes from Piazza della Repubblica to Crescenzago, Turro, Greco and Precotto. The town hall 3 goes from Porta Venezia to Lambrate, passing through Città Studi.

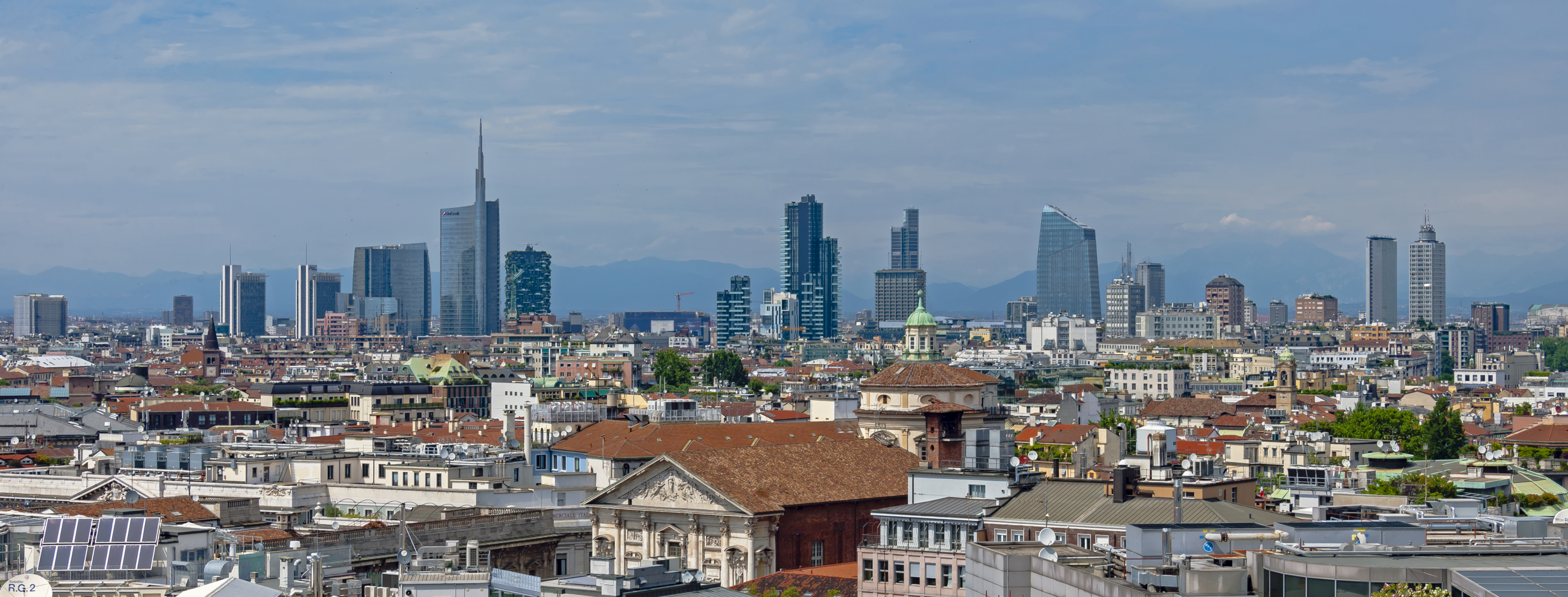
Milan, Italy.

The town hall area 4 goes from Porta Vittoria to the Forlanini park, also including Porta Romana, Corvetto and Santa Giulia. The town hall 5 goes from Porta Ticinese to the Agricultural Park, passing through Chiesa Rossa and Gratosoglio. The town hall 6 goes from the Darsena, up to Barona, Lorenteggio and Giambellino. The city hall area 7 goes from Porta Magenta to Baggio and Figino passing through San Siro. The town hall zone 8 goes from Porta Volta to Quarto Oggiaro, passing through QT8 and Gallaratese. And lastly, the town hall area 9 goes from Porta Nuova to Niguarda and Bovisa. The idea here, is to allow members of the nine zones to get easy access to the CBD. Effective measures have been put in place to limit the impact of human activities on the many water bodies in this city such as restricting land development in riparian areas. In fact, the drive for the establishment of the city on the land where it stands was easy accessibility to water.

=== Indigenous communities ===
Land use planning is an important method for sustainable development for Indigenous communities. Indigenous peoples in the United States and Canada often have fragmented or diminishing land bases with limited uses. Oftentimes, these land bases are also far from urban centers and with limited expansion ability. Since European settlers first began colonizing the American Continent, Indigenous peoples have lost 98.9% of their land, a Yale study found. The lands indigenous peoples were forced onto are facing current and future climate-change related risks. This fact leads to the perpetuation of systematic inequity for Indigenous peoples, since livelihoods, preservation of culture and tradition, access to adequate housing, and access to resources are all factors that are deeply rooted in land. Many Indigenous groups are embracing land use planning to determine the future of their territories. In Canada, for example, the Dehcho First Nations have developed a land use plan that honors cultural traditions and Elders' knowledge, and incorporates conservation, development zones, and other categories. This plan, which has been extensively researched, can serve as an excellent model for other Indigenous Nations, and for cities and areas across North America.

=== Examples in the Global South ===
While most of the examples discussed in this article were drawn from cities in the Global North, land use planning has been employed in cities all over the world. The Global North has traditionally been dominant in planning theory and practice. However, as the world continues to quickly urbanize, and the global population increases, most of the new global population growth is occurring in cities in the developing world, or the Global South. Many of the assumptions about land use planning do not hold true elsewhere in the world, especially as developing nations face urbanization at a more rapid scale than most countries in the Global North. In India, for example, land use planning, specifically as it pertains to siting industries, has been incorporated into the nation's constitution, and is controlled by the State and Federal levels of government.

=== The future of land use planning ===
Due to the increasing discussions in the issues of climate change and global warming, the future of land use planning will be dominated by environmental sustainability themes more than economic convenience. Also, due to the fact that the world is quickly urbanizing, and this massive population growth is mostly occurring in cities in the Global South, some of the assumptions we have formed about land use planning must be reimagined, as common theory and practice is no longer always relevant to those cities that are currently practicing land use planning.

== See also ==
- Environmental planning – Considering environment in developing land
- Federal Land Use Policy Act of 1976 – United States federal law governing public land management
- Geographic Information Systems – System to capture, manage, and present geographic data
- Inter-municipal land use planning
- Landscape architecture – Design of outdoor public areas, landmarks, and structures
- Landscape planning – Branch of architecture
- List of urban plans
- Planning permission – Government permission required for construction or expansion
- Regional planning – Land use planning above city or town level
- Smart growth – Urban planning philosophy
- Spatial planning – Technique for physical organisation of space
- Sustainable development – Mode of human development
- Transferable development rights – Concept in American planning law
- Transportation planning – Process of planning for movement of people and goods
- Urban design – Designing and shaping of human settlements
- Urban planning – Technical process of land use and urban design
- Village Development Committee (India)

== Academic journals ==
- Journal of Transport and Landuse
- Environment and Planning
- Journal of land use and Environmental Law
- Journal of the American Planning Association
- Planning Theory
