= Comunis =

COMUNIS

Comunis is a European Union funded inter-municipal project in the Alpine region of Europe which aims to stimulate economic development and protect the environment of the area. It is part of the international "Alpine Space Programme", which is also co-funded by the EU.
