= Multiple principal problem =

The multiple principal problem, also known as the common agency problem, the multiple accountabilities problem, or the problem of serving two masters, is an extension of the principal–agent problem that explains problems that can occur when one person or entity acts on behalf of multiple other persons or entities. Specifically, the multiple principal problem states that when one person or entity (the "agent") is able to make decisions and / or take actions on behalf of, or that impact, multiple other entities: the "principals", the existence of asymmetric information and self-interest and moral hazard among the parties can cause the agent's behavior to differ substantially from what is in the joint principals' interest, bringing large inefficiencies. The multiple principal problem has been used to explain inefficiency in many types of cooperation, particularly in the public sector, including in parliaments, ministries, agencies, inter-municipal cooperation, and public-private partnerships, although the multiple principal problem also occurs in firms with multiple shareholders.

== Background: principal–agent theory ==
When one person or entity (an agent) acts on behalf of another person or entity (a principal), a principal–agent relationship exists. There are often benefits to these relationships, usually because the agent has some expertise the principal does not have. However, this type of relationship also causes some problems for the principal. Since there is asymmetric information, where the principal is not necessarily aware of what the agent is doing, moral hazard can exist: the agent can act in such a way that the agent's own interests are met, rather than those of the principal. This is called the principal–agent problem and is an important theory in economics and political science.

Principal–agent theory has suggested that some governance mechanisms can help align the interest of the principal with those of the agent. Steering and monitoring are key mechanisms to bring this about. Clear directives build awareness of expectations, and provide the principal with criteria to audit; similarly, some incentives, such as variable pay or bonus-malus systems, can help align the agent's interests with the principal's interest. Monitoring the agent also helps, but can come at high costs. Altogether, these governance mechanisms can help make the agent more accountable to the principal.

== Multiple principals ==
The simple principal–agent model involves only one agent, one principal, and one task, and is a simplification of reality. In organizations, relationships typically involve multiple actors, and in particular, multiple principals. The director of a firm acts on behalf of all shareholders, typically not on behalf of one. Once multiple principals are introduced, governance gets substantially harder, and so the principal–agent problem gets more serious.

The multiple principal problem occurs specifically when one agent acts on behalf of multiple principals. The principal–agent problem here is intensified: not only is there still asymmetric information between the principals and agent that can bring moral hazard, but there is also asymmetric information between the principals themselves that can lead to moral hazard between the principals. In particular, since principals' interests often diverge, they face incentives to advance their individual interests instead of the joint interests by all principals, in addition to the moral hazard problem that is still faced by the agent. As a result, introducing governance to align the interests of the principals with those of the agent is much more difficult.

== Consequences ==
The multiple principal problem can surface in many ways. First, individual principals may lobby or bribe the agent to advance their interests in lieu of those of the other principals. Second, individual principals may free-ride in the steering or monitoring of the agent, leading to insufficient governance. Third, and alternatively principals may duplicate steering and monitoring that other principals have already pursued, leading to much higher costs of governance than necessary, again discouraging governance. All of this can lead to conflict between principals and higher than usual autonomy for the agent, in turn causing even more asymmetric information between principals and agent and increasing the moral hazard risk of the agent. This in turn leads to much inefficiency.

== Examples ==
The multiple principal problem is a serious problem in particularly the public sector, where democratic institutions make the presence of multiple principals common. Both efficiency and democratic accountability are undermined in the absence of salient governance. An example of how this can occur in practice is when Congress and the White House pressure agencies to pursue conflicting objectives. In this case, the agencies gain a lot of room to maneuver, benevolently or opportunistically, capable of cooperating with either principal on a case-by-case basis, able to play out both branches of government against each other and making the agencies less accountable to the public. Examples of other public sector organizations in which this problem may occur are in parliaments, ministries, agencies, intermunicipal cooperation, and public-private partnerships.

However, the multiple principal problem can also occur in the private sector, for instance in firms with multiple shareholders. The field of corporate governance deals among others with the governance mechanisms that limit inefficiencies in such firms with shared ownership.

== Solutions ==
Elections have been proposed as a solution to the multiple principal problem. If the multiple principals can delegate governance of the agent to one principal whose interests approximately represent the joint interests of the principals, inefficiencies from moral hazard between the principals can be reduced. Median voter theorem suggests that electoral processes can help bring this about. If delegation through elections is successful, elections can reduce the multiple principal problem to essentially a dyadic principal–agent problem, which should be much less severe.
