= Alpine Convention =

International territorial treaty

- Logo of the Alpine Convention
- Signed: 7 November 1991
- Location: Salzburg, Austria
- Effective: 1995
- Parties: Austria; France; Germany; Italy; Liechtenstein; Monaco; Slovenia; Switzerland; (Europe) European Union
- Depositary: Austrian State Archives
- Languages: English, French, German, Italian, Slovenian

The Alpine Convention (AC), formally the Convention on the Protection of the Alps, is an international treaty on the comprehensive protection and sustainable development of the Alps. The Convention is a pioneer of its kind as the first international treaty covering a whole mountain range that crosses several national borders.

The Framework Convention was signed by the eight Alpine countries (Austria, France, Germany, Italy, Liechtenstein, Monaco, Switzerland and Slovenia) and the former European Community (now the European Union) and came into effect in 1995. It is complemented by ten protocols.

The Alpine Conference is the regular high-level meeting of the Contracting Parties, who gather approximately every two years to discuss and take decisions on various topics. Since 2003, a Permanent Secretariat of the Alpine Convention has been established to support the bodies of the Alpine Convention. The Permanent Secretariat’s main office is in Innsbruck, Austria, and it has an operational branch office at the European Academy Bolzano (EURAC) in Bolzano/Bozen, Italy.

== Geographic area of the Alpine Convention ==
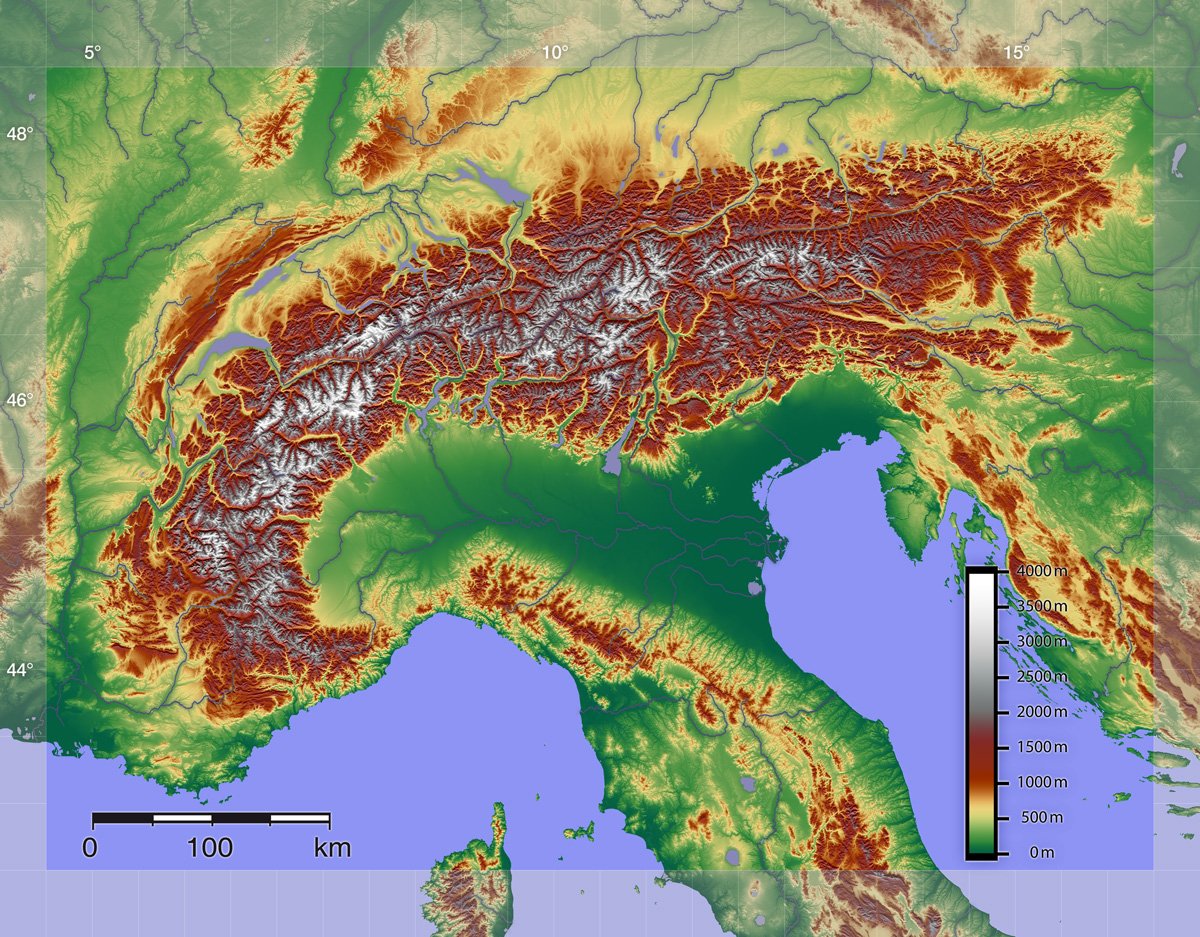
Alpine arc

The geographic area of the Alpine Convention covers a 190,717 km^{2} or 73,636 sq mi encompassing 5867 municipalities (data from 2013). The Alpine Range as defined by the Alpine Convention stretches across 1,200 km or 746 mi, through eight states, and its maximum width is 300 km or 186 mi, between Bavaria and Northern Italy. The entire territories of Monaco and Liechtenstein are included. Austria and Italy together represent more than 55% of the convention area. With France, these three states cover the three-quarter of the total surface of the Alpine Convention territory. In 2013, the total population of this area was approaching 15 million inhabitants.

== The Institutions of the Alpine Convention ==
=== The Alpine Conference ===
The Alpine Conference is the body that takes the most important decisions on behalf of the convention. The conference is held at the end of each two-year presidency of the Alpine Convention, which rotates between the contracting parties. The conference is chaired by the current presidency, for the period 2022–2024 the presidency is held by Slovenia.

=== The Permanent Committee ===
The Permanent Committee is the executive body of the Alpine Conference and is made up of the delegates of the Contracting Parties. The Permanent Committee monitors the implementation of the guiding ideas, principles, and objectives of the Convention. As a rule, it meets twice a year.

The Permanent Committee’s tasks are to examine the information provided by the Contracting Parties on the implementation of the Convention and to prepare the report of the Alpine Conference. The Committee prepares the content of the Alpine Conference meetings as well as proposing the agenda. The Committee is also responsible for setting the working groups to draft protocols and recommendations, coordinating their activities and reviewing, harmonising and communicating the content of draft protocols of the Alpine Conference.

=== The Compliance Committee ===
The compliance committee is the body that oversees implementation of the commitments and obligations taken under the Alpine Convention. Every 10 years, Contracting Parties have to publish a report concerning the implementation of the convention and its protocols. The first report was adopted at the Xth Alpine Conference (March 2009).

=== The Permanent Secretariat ===
The permanent secretariat, created in 2003, supports all the other bodies of the Alpine Convention by providing logistic and administrative support, and by helping the Contracting parties, especially in implementing projects. The secretariat has its main office in Innsbruck, Austria, and a branch office in Bolzano-Bozen, Italy, and is headed by a secretary general, currently Alenka Smerkolj.

=== Thematic Working Bodies ===
The permanent committee can establish thematic working bodies, with two-year mandates, on topics it considers relevant to support sustainable development within the Alps. The main responsibility of these working groups is the development of new protocols, recommendations and implementation measures, studies of ongoing developments and reports on the progress to the Alpine Conference and permanent committee.

Nine working groups and platforms are currently active:

- Working Group Transport
- Natural Hazards Platform
- Ecological Network Platform
- Water Management Platform in the Alpine space
- Large Carnivores and Wild Ungulates and Society Platform – WISO
- Working Group "Macro-regional strategy for the Alps"
- "Mountain Farming" Platform
- "Mountain Forest" Working group
- Expert Group -Report from the State of the Alps-

Working groups active in the past were:

- Working Group UNESCO World Heritage
- Working Group "Demography and Employment"
- "Sustainable tourism" Working group

== Framework Convention and its Protocols ==
The first meeting of interested countries took place in Berchtesgaden in December 1989. On 7 November 1991 the Framework Convention was signed by Austria, Germany, France, Italy, Liechtenstein and Switzerland. Slovenia signed on 29 March 1993 and Monaco on 20 December 1994. Ratification occurred between 1994 and 1999. Below is a brief overview about the signatures and the state of ratification:

State	Signature	Ratification	Entry into force
Austria	1991	1994	1995
Switzerland	1991	1998	1999
Germany	1991	1994	1995
France	1991	1995	1996
Liechtenstein	1991	1994	1995
Italy	1991	1999	2000
Monaco	1994	1998	1999
Slovenia	1993	1995	1995
EU	1991	1996	1998

To date, Alpine states have signed all the protocols, except Monaco that did not sign the protocol 'Energy' and the European Union that did not sign the protocols 'Mountain Forests' and 'Settlement of disputes'. Regarding protocol ratification, Switzerland has not ratified any protocols yet.

== Protocols and Declarations linked to the Framework Convention ==
Under the convention, Member States should adopt specific measures in twelve thematic areas (Population and Culture, Spatial Planning, Air pollution, Soil Conservation, Water Management, Conservation of Nature and the Countryside, Mountain Farming, Mountain Forests, Tourism, Transport, Energy, and Waste Management). Of these areas, eight are now protocols annexed to the Framework Convention:

- Spatial Planning and Sustainable Development;
- Mountain Farming;
- Conservation of Nature and Landscape Protection;
- Mountain Forests;
- Tourism;
- Soil Conservation;
- Energy;
- Transports.

Two new protocols, not related to a specific thematic area, have since been adopted:

- Settlement of disputes;
- Adherence of the Principality of Monaco to the Alpine Convention.

The Alpine Convention includes two Declarations that could not be turned into Protocols:

- Declaration on Population and Culture;
- Declaration on Climate Change.

== Publications of the Permanent Secretariat of the Alpine Convention ==
Main source:

- Alpine Signals 1. The Alpine Convention- Reference guide, 2010, second edition, available in English, German, French, Italian and Slovenian.
- Alpine Signals 2. The Alpine Convention is taking shape, 2004, available in German, French, Italian and Slovenian.
- Alpine Signals 3. Cross-border ecological network, 2004, available in German, French, Italian and Slovenian.
- Alpine Signals 4. Natural events documentation, 2006, available in German, French, Italian and Slovenian.
- Alpine Signals 5. Mitigation and adaptation to climate change in the Alpine Space, 2008
- Alpine Signals 6
- Report on the State of the Alps #1. Transport and Mobility, 2007
- Report on the State of the Alps #2. Water and water management issues, 2009
- Report on the State of the Alps #3. Sustainable rural development and innovation, 2011
- Report on the State of the Alps #4. Sustainable tourism in the Alps, 2013
- Report on the State of the Alps #5. Demographic changes in the Alps, 2015
- Report on the State of the Alps #6. Greening the economy in the Alpine region, 2017
- Towards Renewable Alps. Towards Renewable Alps, 2017
- Multi-Annual Work Programme of the Alpine Conference 2017–2022. Multi-Annual Work Programme of the Alpine Conference 2017–2022, 2017
- The Alps-Eight countries, a single territory, 2009; second edition, 2016
- PER ALPES. Discovering the Alps in 20 circular walks, 2010
- THE ALPS. People and pressures in the mountains, the facts at a glance. Vademecum, 2010
- Establishing an Alpine Ecological Network, 2007
- Alpine Signals FOCUS 1
- Implementation manuals of the Alpine Convention and best practice
- Environmental Protection and Mountains

== See also ==
- List of national parks of the Alps
- Alpine Space Programme, an EU co-funded programme to enhance the competitiveness and attractiveness of the alpine region
- European Landscape Convention
- Alpine Town of the Year
- Via Alpina
