= Planning Theory =

- Discipline: Urban studies, city planning
- Language: English
- Edited by: Michael Gunder

Publication details
- History: 2002–present
- Publisher: SAGE Publications
- Frequency: Quarterly
- Impact factor: 1.333 (2013)

Standard abbreviations
- ISO 4: Plan. Theory

Indexing
- ISSN: 1473-0952 (print); 1741-3052 (web)
- LCCN: 2002227048
- OCLC no.: 612094738

Links
- Journal homepage; Online access; Online archive

Planning Theory is a quarterly peer-reviewed academic journal that covers the field of city planning and land development. The editor-in-chief is Michael Gunder (University of Auckland) . The journal was established in 2002 and is published by SAGE Publications.

== Abstracting and indexing ==
The journal is abstracted and indexed in Scopus and the Social Sciences Citation Index. According to the Journal Citation Reports, its 2013 impact factor is 1.333, ranking it 20th out of 55 journals in the category "Planning and Development".
