= Alpine Space Programme =

- Logo
- Motto: "Investing in your future!"
- Type: Transnational cooperation
- Membership: 7 countries: Austria; France; Germany; Italy; Liechtenstein; Slovenia; Switzerland
- Establishment: 2007–2013

Area
  - Total: 450,000 km^{2} (170,000 sq mi)

Population
  - Estimate: 70,000,000
- GDP (nominal): estimate
  - Total: € 1.596 billion
  - Per capita: €22,800
- Website http://www.alpine-space.eu

The Alpine Space Programme is a transnational cooperation programme in the framework of the European Union cohesion policy. In this programme, stakeholders from the participating countries in the Alps cooperate on various transnational projects.

== Cooperation area ==
Geographically, the Alpine Space Programme cooperation area comprises the Alpine core area (in the sense of the Alpine Convention), the surrounding foothills and lowlands of the "peri-Alpine belt", a part of the Mediterranean coastal area including the Adriatic and parts of the great river valleys of Danube, Po, Adige, Rhône and Rhine.

In the cooperation area live about 70 million inhabitants on a surface of approximately 450.000 km^{2}.

== Policy framework ==
The Alpine Space Programme 2007–2013 is part of the European Territorial Cooperation objective. The European Territorial Cooperation (ETC) has been developed from the Community Initiative INTERREG. INTERREG was created in the framework of the EU's cohesion policy as an incentive for cooperation within the EU. Cohesion policy encourages regions and cities from different EU Member States to work together and learn through joint programmes, projects and networks. In the Structural Fund period 2007–2013 the Community Initiative INTERREG has been upgraded to the "European Territorial Cooperation Objective". In the current programme period 2007–13 the ETC objective covers three types of programmes: cross-border cooperation, transnational cooperation and interregional cooperation. The Alpine Space Programme is one of the 13 programmes of the transnational cooperation objective.

This allows work between regions from EU Member States on matters such as communication corridors, flood management, international business and research linkages, and the development of viable and sustainable markets.

The ETC is funded by the European Regional Development Fund (ERDF).

== Priorities ==
The Alpine Space Programme identifies three fields of cooperation, called priorities. With these priorities the programme supports the Lisbon and Gothenburg strategies towards growth, employment and sustainable development with a strong focus on the cross cutting theme innovation.

=== Competitiveness and attractiveness ===
One of the Alpine Space Programme's priorities in the funding period 2007–2013 is to enhance the attractiveness and competitiveness of the alpine region. Although the Alpine area is characterised by a diversified economic structure with strong links to the territory and a polycentric urban system, low internal innovation capacities of SMEs, urban sprawl and depopulation reduce its competitiveness and attractiveness. In this context the challenge lies in strengthening the innovation capabilities of SMEs, in creating environments for the development of SMEs and fostering cooperation between R&TC centers and SMEs. Development options posed by traditional sectors and the cultural heritage are to be used more intensely.

=== Accessibility and connectivity ===
The second programme priority ia accessibility and connectivity. The Alpine Space is both a centre of an economy and a transit area in a sensitive environment. At the same time, it shows particular constraints in the fields of transport, communication and knowledge infrastructure. It faces natural constraints as regards accessibility and connectivity. The access to these public services however is crucial in order to meet the requirements of labour markets. For these reasons the Alpine Space Programme aims to secure and improve access to public services in the Alpine regions. With this priority the programme aims to improve the quality of transport of passengers and goods while mitigating the negative effects of traffic. Moreover, sustainable solutions should be found to help the local population to be better connected to wider networks. Therefore, the programme promotes joint actions which take into consideration integrated planning of transport and mobility, or ICT-based innovative public services for citizens and economy.

=== Environment and risk prevention ===
The third priority is environment and risk prevention. The Alpine space has rich landscapes, cultural heritage and biodiversity. The natural environment and the natural heritage as a fundament for the living conditions and the economy. Integrated approaches to plan, manage and develop these resources can contribute to this. The programme wants the operations under this priority to be focused on the management and safeguard of environmental resources and cultural heritage as well as on natural and technological hazards. Furthermore, the Alps are earlier and more affected by the climate change than the rest of Europe.

== Operation ==
To maintain and enhance the competitiveness and attractiveness of the Alpine region the Alpine Space Programme co-finances transnational cooperation projects. The programme launches calls for project proposals, allowing potential project partnerships to apply for. For each call, Terms of References (ToR), containing framework information for the application are published. These ToRs and the launch of a new call are published on the programme's website. A project partnership has to consist of project partners coming from at least three different Partner States.
