= Ludic fallacy =

Conceptual fallacy by Nassim Taleb

The ludic fallacy, proposed by Nassim Nicholas Taleb in his book The Black Swan (2007), is "the misuse of games to model real-life situations". Taleb explains the fallacy as "basing studies of chance on the narrow world of games and dice". The adjective ludic originates from the Latin noun ludus, meaning "play, game, sport, pastime".

== Description ==
The fallacy is a central argument in the book and a rebuttal of the predictive mathematical models used to predict the future – as well as an attack on the idea of applying naïve and simplified statistical models in complex domains. According to Taleb, statistics is applicable only in some domains, for instance casinos in which the odds are visible and defined. Taleb's argument centers on the idea that predictive models are based on platonified forms, gravitating towards mathematical purity and failing to take various aspects into account:

- It is impossible to be in possession of the entirety of available information.
- Small unknown variations in the data could have a huge impact. Taleb differentiates his idea from that of mathematical notions in chaos theory (e.g., the butterfly effect).
- Theories or models based on empirical data are claimed to be flawed as they may not be able to predict events which are previously unobserved, but have tremendous impact (e.g., the 9/11 terrorist attacks or the invention of the automobile), also known as black swan theory.

== Examples ==
=== Example: Suspicious coin ===
One example given in the book is the following thought experiment. Two people are involved:

- Dr. John who is regarded as a man of science and logical thinking
- Fat Tony who is regarded as a man who lives by his wits

A third party asks them to "assume that a coin is fair, i.e., has an equal probability of coming up heads or tails when flipped. I flip it ninety-nine times and get heads each time. What are the odds of my getting tails on my next throw?"

- Dr. John says that the odds are not affected by the previous outcomes so the odds must still be 50:50.
- Fat Tony says that the odds of the coin coming up heads 99 times in a row are so low that the initial assumption that the coin had a 50:50 chance of coming up heads is most likely incorrect. "The coin gotta be loaded. It can't be a fair game."

The ludic fallacy here is to assume that in real life the rules from the purely hypothetical model (where Dr. John is correct) apply. A reasonable person, for example, would not bet on red on a roulette table that has come up black 26 times in a row (especially as the reward for a correct guess is so low when compared with the probable odds that the game is fixed).

In classical terms, statistically significant events, i.e. unlikely events, should make one question one's model assumptions. In Bayesian statistics, this can be modelled by using a prior distribution for one's assumptions on the fairness of the coin, then Bayesian inference to update this distribution . This idea is modelled in the Beta distribution .

=== Example: Fighting ===
Nassim Taleb shares an example that comes from his friend and trading partner, Mark Spitznagel. "A martial version of the ludic fallacy: organized competitive fighting trains the athlete to focus on the game and, in order not to dissipate his concentration, to ignore the possibility of what is not specifically allowed by the rules, such as kicks to the groin, a surprise knife, et cetera. So those who win the gold medal might be precisely those who will be most vulnerable in real life."

== Relation to platonicity ==
The ludic fallacy is a specific case of the more general problem of platonicity, defined by Nassim Taleb as:

the focus on those pure, well-defined, and easily discernible objects like triangles, or more social notions like friendship or love, at the cost of ignoring those objects of seemingly messier and less tractable structures.

== See also ==
- List of fallacies
  - Kouska's fallacy
  - McNamara fallacy
- "All models are wrong"
- Assume a can opener
- Black swan theory
- Congruence bias
- Cromwell's rule
- Déformation professionnelle
- Demarcation problem
- Focusing effect
- Hindsight bias
- Laplace's demon
- Map-territory relation
- Quasi-empiricism in mathematics
- Spherical cow
- Unexpected hanging paradox
- Wicked problem
