= Black Swan fund =

Investment fund that prepares for sharp market downturns

A Black Swan fund is an investment fund based on the black swan theory that seek to reap big rewards from sharp market downturns. They became more known after the 2008 financial crisis.

One example of a "Black Swan" fund is Universa, which was founded by Mark Spitznagel and advised by Nicholas Taleb. During the 2008 financial crisis, the fund posted returns of over 100%. In August 2015, Universa Investments made more than $1 billion in profits in one week, representing a 20% YTD return.
