= Antifragile (book) =

2012 book by Nassim Nicholas Taleb

Antifragile: Things That Gain from Disorder
- Hardcover, 1st edition
- Author: Nassim Nicholas Taleb
- Language: English
- Series: Incerto
- Subject: Philosophy, mathematics, business, economics
- Genre: Non-fiction
- Publisher: Random House (US); Penguin Books (UK)
- Publication date: November 27, 2012
- Publication place: United States
- Media type: Print, E-book
- Pages: 519 pp
- ISBN: 1-400-06782-0
- Dewey Decimal: 155.24 TA
- Preceded by: The Bed of Procrustes
- Followed by: Skin in the Game

Antifragile: Things That Gain From Disorder is a book by Nassim Nicholas Taleb published on November 27, 2012, by Random House in the United States and Penguin in the United Kingdom. This book builds upon ideas from his previous works including Fooled by Randomness (2001), The Black Swan (2007–2010), and The Bed of Procrustes (2010–2016), and is the fourth book in the five-volume philosophical treatise on uncertainty titled Incerto. Some of the ideas are expanded on in Taleb's fifth book Skin in the Game: Hidden Asymmetries in Daily Life (2018).

== Summary ==
=== Basic Definition of "Antifragility" ===
The book starts by explaining the concept of antifragility as the direct opposite of fragility. (Importantly, robustness is not antifragility: the two concepts are related but separate.)

A fragile system is significantly harmed by disorder. A robust system is slightly harmed (or unharmed) by disorder. By contrast, an antifragile system benefits from disorder.

The book uses a wine glass as an example of a physically-fragile object: it shatters when it receives a physical impact. (Here, the physical impact is the disorder.) A block of metal would therefore be considered robust as it can withstand impact without being destroyed. There appear to be very few physical (inanimate) materials with antifragile properties.

However, there are many antifragile systems in other domains. In biology, hormesis and antimicrobial resistance are both examples of antifragility. (In both cases, the source of disorder is a "poisonous" substance.)

The Lernaean Hydra is an example of antifragility in Greek mythology: when it experiences disorder (by having one of its heads cut off), it benefits (by growing two more heads).

Political movements often have antifragile properties, in response to authoritarian suppression: a political demonstrator, if killed, often becomes a martyr and therefore increases the general public's hatred of the authoritarian regime.

=== Technical Details ===
Centrally, Taleb views antifragility as a nonlinear response linked to Jensen's Inequality. He summarized the gist of his book in a letter to Nature: "Simply, antifragility is defined as a convex response to a stressor or source of harm (for some range of variation), leading to a positive sensitivity to increase in volatility (or variability, stress, dispersion of outcomes, or uncertainty, what is grouped under the designation "disorder cluster"). Likewise, fragility is defined as a concave sensitivity to stressors, leading to a negative sensitivity to an increase in volatility.

Taleb's thesis is that in a volatile world with a lot of destructive uncertainty, the wise economic strategy is to be antifragile: protect the downside but prepare to benefit disproportionately from potential external negative events and in all cases avoid fragility. An everyday example of this strategy contrasts a highly paid executive with an expensive lifestyle and debts (fragile, highly vulnerable to unemployment which could be catastrophic) with a self-employed taxi driver with no debt (resilient, unlikely to suffer an economic disaster). To move on to becoming antifragile then requires a combination of low fixed obligations with making small bets that have asymmetric payoffs. Taleb applies these concepts to a range of economic and philosophical situations with the thesis that while the modern world is full of fragility (deriving from debt, technology and economic structures that encourage obligations, leading to a reliance upon external circumstances remaining predictable and unchanging), older societies were better at managing risk with lessons for life, public policy and economic choices. Building on these ideas, Taleb develops the following themes, including examples of where individuals may be making themselves antifragile at society's or other people's expense.

=== Skin in the game ===
To have "skin in the game" is to have incurred risk by being involved in achieving a goal. Taleb extends the definition to include any risk so that "Every captain goes down with every ship". This removes the agency problem or in other words, the "Situation in which the manager of a business is not the true owner, so he follows a strategy that cosmetically seems to be sound, but in a hidden way benefits him and makes him antifragile at the expense (fragility) of the true owners or society. When he is right, he collects large benefits; when he is wrong, others pay the price. Typically, this problem leads to fragility, as it is easy to hide risks. It also affects politicians and academics. A major source of fragility."

To me, every opinion maker needs to have "skin in the game" in the event of harm caused by reliance on his information or opinion (not having such persons as, say, the people who helped cause the criminal Iraq invasion come out of it completely unscathed). Further, anyone producing a forecast or making an economic analysis needs to have something to lose from it, given that others rely on those forecasts (to repeat, forecasts induce risk taking; they are more toxic to us than any other form of human pollution).

Taleb's following book, Skin in the Game: Hidden Asymmetries in Daily Life, furthers the idea, asserting it is necessary for fairness, commercial efficiency, and risk management, as well as necessary to understand the world.

=== Via negativa ===
Via negativa is a type of theological thinking that attempts to describe God by negation or in other words, by what God is not. Taleb expanded this definition to include more generally the focus on what something is not, in action, what to avoid or what not to do. Avoiding the doctor for minor illnesses or removing certain food from one's diet to improve health are examples.

I would add that, in my own experience, a considerable jump in my personal health has been achieved by removing offensive irritants: the morning newspapers (the mere mention of the names of the fragilista journalists Thomas Friedman or Paul Krugman can lead to explosive bouts of unrequited anger on my part), the boss, the daily commute, air-conditioning (though not heating), television, emails from documentary filmmakers, economic forecasts, news about the stock market, gym "strength training" machines, and many more.

=== Lindy effect ===
The Lindy Effect states that technology, or anything nonperishable, increases in life expectancy with every day of its life. So, a book that has been in print for a hundred years is likely to stay in print for another hundred years, according to the theory. The opposite is neomania, a love of change for its own sake, a form of philistinism that does not comply with the Lindy effect and that understands fragility. Forecasts the future by adding, not subtracting.

=== Barbell strategy ===
In finance, a barbell strategy is formed when a trader invests in long and short-duration bonds but does not invest in intermediate-duration bonds. This strategy is useful when interest rates are rising; as the short-term maturities are rolled over they receive a higher interest rate, raising the value. Taleb generalizes the phenomenon and applies it to other domains. Essentially it is the transformation of anything from fragile to antifragile.

A dual strategy, a combination of two extremes, one safe and one speculative, deemed more robust than a "monomodal" strategy; often a necessary condition for antifragility. For instance, in biological systems, the equivalent of marrying an accountant (stable life) and having an occasional fling with a rock star (good fun); for a writer, getting a stable sinecure and writing without the pressures of the market during spare time. Even trial and error are a form of barbell.

=== Green Lumber Fallacy ===
The Green Lumber Fallacy refers to a kind of fallacy where one mistakes one important kind of knowledge for another; in other words, "mistaking the source of important or even necessary knowledge, for another less visible from the outside, less tractable one... how many things we call 'relevant knowledge' aren't so much so". The root of the fallacy is that although people may be focusing on the right things, due to the complexity of the thing, they are not good enough to figure it out intellectually.

The term green lumber refers to a story by authors Jim Paul and Brendan Moynihan in their book What I Learned Losing A Million Dollars, where a trader made a fortune trading lumber he thought was literally "green" rather than fresh cut. "This gets at the idea that a supposed understanding of an investment rationale, a narrative, or a theoretical model is unhelpful in practical trading."

The protagonist makes a big discovery. He remarks that a fellow named Joe Siegel, one of the most successful traders in a commodity called "green lumber," actually thought that it was lumber painted green (rather than freshly cut lumber, called green because it had not been dried). And he made it his profession to trade the stuff! Meanwhile the narrator was into grand intellectual theories and narratives of what caused the price of commodities to move, and went bust. It is not just that the successful expert on lumber was ignorant of central matters like the designation "green." He also knew things about lumber that nonexperts think are unimportant. People we call ignorant might not be ignorant. The fact is that predicting the order flow in lumber and the usual narrative had little to do with the details one would assume from the outside are important. People who do things in the field are not subjected to a set exam; they are selected in the most nonnarrative manner—nice arguments don't make much difference.

==== Early occurrences ====
An early occurrence of this fallacy is found in the ancient story of Thales. Aristotle explains that Thales reserved presses ahead of the olive harvest at a discount only to rent them out at a high price when demand peaked, following his predictions of a particularly good harvest. Aristotle attributes Thales' success to his ability to correctly forecast the weather. However, it was not his ability to forecast that made Thales successful but that "Thales put himself in a position to take advantage of his lack of knowledge… that he did not need to understand too much the messages from the stars… that was the very first option on record".

=== Green Lumber Problem ===
The Green Lumber Fallacy only becomes a problem (namely, the Green Lumber Problem) when the perpetuation of the fallacy has a high, and opaque, negative impact. For example:

- Green Lumber Fallacy and a Green Lumber Problem: "James Le Fanu showed how our understanding of the biological processes was coupled with a decline of pharmaceutical discoveries, as if rationalistic theories were blinding and somehow a handicap".
- Green Lumber Fallacy only: "The same holds for the statement 'lifting weights increases your muscle mass'. In the past they used to say that weight lifting caused the 'micro-tearing of muscles', with subsequent healing and increase in size. Today some people discuss hormonal signaling or genetic mechanisms, tomorrow they will discuss something else. But the effect has held forever and will continue to do so."

=== The Alan Blinder problem ===
Toward the end of the book Taleb provides examples of the problems of agency and cherry-picking, calling them the Robert Rubin problem, the Joseph Stiglitz problem, and the Alan Blinder problem. In the last chapter (p. 412), for example, Taleb criticizes Alan Blinder, the former vice chairman of the board of governors of the Federal Reserve System for trying to sell him an investment product at Davos in 2008 which would allow an investor to circumvent the regulations limiting deposit insurance and to benefit from coverage for near unlimited amounts. Taleb commented that the scheme "would allow the super-rich to scam taxpayers by getting free government-sponsored insurance". He also criticized Blinder for using ex-regulators to game the system which they built in the first place and for voicing his opposition to policies of bank insurance that would hurt his business, i.e., claiming that what is good for his business is "for the public good". The event has been discussed in the media, but not denied by Blinder.

== Impact ==
The concept of antifragility has been applied in physics, risk analysis, molecular biology, transportation planning, engineering, Aerospace (NASA), and computer science.

In computer science, there is a structured proposal for an "Antifragile Software Manifesto", to react to traditional system designs. The major idea is to develop antifragility by design, building a system which improves from environmental inputs.

== Critical reception ==
Antifragile was a New York Times Bestseller and praised by critics in a litany of notable periodicals including the Harvard Business Review, Fortune magazine, the New Statesman, and The Economist, and Forbes. Although Boyd Tonkin of The Independent criticized Taleb's style as "vulgar, silly, slapdash and infuriating", of the ideas in the book he remarked "time and again I returned to two questions about his core ideas: Is he right, and does it matter? My verdict? Yes, and yes." Michael Shermer gave the book a generally favorable review but Taleb responded in Nature magazine that "Michael Shermer mischaracterizes the concept of 'antifragility'... The relation of fragility, convexity and sensitivity to disorder is thus mathematical and not derived from empirical data."

Less favorable reviews include Michiko Kakutani of The New York Times, who described the book as being "maddening, bold, repetitious, judgmental, intemperate, erudite, reductive, shrewd, self-indulgent, self-congratulatory, provocative, pompous, penetrating, perspicacious and pretentious." Taleb responded with a blog post fact checking the review where he accused the reviewer of being "pathologically crazy" and a "pseudo-expert." In a review for The Guardian, David Runciman agreed that we "live in a fragile world, vulnerable to extreme shocks", but said "antifragility is not the solution", deeming the concept antisocial; he also criticized Taleb's claim that government debt is a form of fragility. In response, Taleb said Runciman "missed the central idea of the book", convexity.

== See also ==
- Eustress
- Howlers
- Moral hazard
- Antifragility
