= Home-Stake Production Company =

U.S. oil and gas company

Home-Stake Production Company was a company involved in a fraudulent oil and gas tax-shelter scheme. It was one of the largest Ponzi schemes uncovered in the 1970s with over $100 million lost. Its victims included a large number of prominent names in the entertainment, business and political worlds.

The company was founded by Robert S. Trippet, an attorney, in 1955 in Tulsa, Oklahoma. The company was initially started to develop oil and gas properties, but little was actually developed. In later years, employees would paint farmers' water irrigation pipes and show them to potential investors as oil pipelines from their oil wells. The company sent out fraudulent financial statements to investors and the Securities and Exchange Commission. "Profit" participations to older investors were paid from funds coming from new investors.

Over 2,000 people invested in the tax-shelter plans. On June 26, 1974, The Wall Street Journal broke the story of what it said "may be the biggest swindle of its kind in history"; Notable names from the entertainment industry included: Andy Williams (the largest investor with $538,000, similar to $3.4 million in 2023), Walter Matthau ($200,000), Jack Benny, famous for his tightwad public persona and teen idol David Cassidy (both with $300,000), Buddy Hackett ($208,000), Liza Minnelli ($231,000) Candice Bergen ($125,000), Bob Dylan ($78,000), and Barbra Streisand ($28,500). Politicians who invested included United States Senators Jacob Javits of New York and Ernest Hollings of South Carolina. Other investors included financial writer George Goodman (writing as "Adam Smith") and high level executives from Citibank, General Electric, Western Union and American Express. Other celebrities mentioned by the SEC were Liza Minnelli ($231,000), Alan Alda ($145,000), Ed Ames ($122,500), Bobbie Gentry ($98,000), Barbara Walters and Phyllis Diller. The company filed bankruptcy in September 1973. In December 1974, 13 officers and associates of the company were charged with conspiracy, mail fraud and stock fraud. In 1976, Trippet and two other top officials of the company pleaded no contest, spent one night in jail and received probation. In addition, Trippet was fined $19,000.

Initial lawsuits by investors were filed against the company in 1973 and they was certified as a class action lawsuit in 1976. However, the litigation involving the company dragged on for decades. It was finally settled in 1996.
