= Raphael Douady =

French mathematician and economist

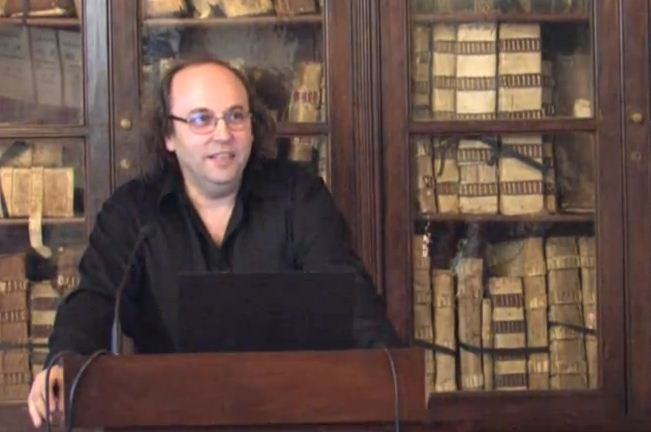
- Born: 15 November 1959 (age 66); Paris, France
- Education: École normale supérieure
- Scientific career
- Fields: Mathematics
- Doctoral advisor: Michael Herman

Raphael Douady (born 15 November 1959) is a French mathematician and economist. He holds the Robert Frey Endowed Chair for Quantitative Finance at Stony Brook, New York. He is a fellow of the Centre d’Economie de la Sorbonne (Economic Centre of Sorbonne), Paris 1 Pantheon-Sorbonne University, and academic director of the LabEx ReFi – European Laboratory on Financial Regulation.

== Early life and education ==
Douady is the son of mathematician Adrien Douady. He is an alumnus of Ecole Normale Supérieure. He earned his PhD in the fields of Hamiltonian systems in 1982 at the Paris Diderot University (Paris 7), while still a student at ENS.

== Career ==
In 1983, Douady was appointed to the Centre National de la Recherche Scientifique (CNRS). He was affiliated with Ecole Polytechnique (1983–87), Ecole Normale Supérieure (1987–95), the Courant Institute at New York University (1995–97), Ecole Normale Supérieure of Cachan (1997–2001), and a former visiting professor at New York University Polytechnic Institute.

In 2013, Douady was appointed as academic director of the Laboratory of Excellence on Financial Regulation (Labex refi), where his role was to supervise approximately sixty researchers on the inter-relations between financial regulations, the financial system and the real economy, and to advise governments and regulators on these issues. In 2015, he was appointed Frey Family endowed chair professor of quantitative finance at State University of New York in Stony Brook University.

=== Notable research ===
Douady worked on the Kolmogorov–Arnold–Moser (KAM) theorem on the existence of invariant tori in Hamiltonian systems. In his PhD thesis he proved the equivalence of KAM theory for Hamiltonian systems and for symplectomorphisms, opening the gate to discrete KAM theory. He contributed to the theory of outer billiards, providing a full proof of a result announced earlier by J. Moser.

Douady is the author of a seminal article in 1988 on Arnold diffusion, where he proved a long-standing conjecture of Vladimir Arnold on the existence of topologically unstable elliptic orbits of Hamiltonian systems in dimensions greater than or equal to 6.

In 1999, he established with Jean-Christophe Yoccoz a theory of automorphic measures of circle diffeomorphisms, a basis for differentiating the rotation number function.

Since 1994, Douady has conducted research in the field of mathematical finance, statistics and economics. He established a generalization of Heath–Jarrow–Morton interest rate model, where the yield curve is represented as a random field. With Monique Jeanblanc, he created a rating-based credit derivatives model that introduced the notion of "rating surface". In collaboration with Albert Shiryaev and Marc Yor he co-authored a theory of Brownian motions downfalls.

Douady has concentrated research on financial instabilities, nonlinearities and systemic risk. He developed a statistical theory, called "Polymodels" that captures nonlinearities in financial markets. One of its outcomes is the anticyclical risk indicator, the "Stress VaR", an extended version of the Basel III stress tests. In a book co-authored with Thomas Barrau, he demonstrated that Polymodels are applicable to a wide range of problems in finance, especially the question of forecasting the behavior of equity and fixed income markets. Based on the Minsky's financial instability hypothesis, Douady proposed Market Instability Indicator based on the first Lyapunov exponent of flows of funds evolution. In collaboration with Nassim Nicholas Taleb he developed the mathematical foundations of "fragility/antifragility" theory.

== Awards ==
- Bronze (1976) and Gold (1977) medallist at the International Mathematical Olympiads.
