= The Bed of Procrustes =

Book by Nassim Nicholas Taleb

The Bed of Procrustes: Philosophical and Practical Aphorisms
- Second edition
- Author: Nassim Nicholas Taleb
- Language: English
- Series: Incerto
- Subject: aphorisms, philosophy
- Genre: Non-fiction
- Publisher: Random House (U.S.)
- Publication date: November 30, 2010
- Publication place: United States
- Media type: Print (Paperback)
- Pages: 157 pp (paperback)
- ISBN: 978-0-8129-8240-4 (U.S.)
- Preceded by: The Black Swan
- Followed by: Antifragile

The Bed of Procrustes: Philosophical and Practical Aphorisms is a philosophy book by Nassim Nicholas Taleb written in the aphoristic style. It was first released on November 30, 2010 by Random House. An updated edition was released on October 26, 2016 that includes fifty percent more material than the 2010 edition. According to Taleb, the book "contrasts the classical values of courage, elegance, and erudition against the modern diseases of nerdiness, philistinism, and phoniness." The title refers to Procrustes, a figure from Greek mythology who abducted travelers and stretched or chopped their bodies to fit the length of his bed.

The book is part of Taleb's five volume philosophical essay on uncertainty, titled the Incerto and covers Antifragile (2012), The Black Swan (2007–2010), Fooled by Randomness (2001),The Bed of Procrustes (2010–2016), and Skin in the Game (2018).
