= Asymmetric payoff =

Possible result of an investment strategy

An asymmetric payoff (also called an asymmetric return) is the set of possible results of an investment strategy where the upside potential is greater than the downside risk. Derivative contracts called “options” are the most common instrument with asymmetric payoff characteristics. Hedge funds that employ this kind of investment strategy include Universa Investments, A North Investments, Pershing Square Capital Management, and others.
