= Financial regulation =

Rules or restrictions for financial institutions

Financial regulation is a broad set of policies that apply to the financial sector in most jurisdictions, justified by two main features of finance: systemic risk, which implies that the failure of financial firms involves public interest considerations; and information asymmetry, which justifies curbs on freedom of contract in selected areas of financial services, particularly those that involve retail clients and/or principal–agent problems. An integral part of financial regulation is the supervision of designated financial firms and markets by specialized authorities such as securities commissions and bank supervisors.

In some jurisdictions, certain aspects of financial supervision are delegated to self-regulatory organizations. Financial regulation forms one of three legal categories which constitutes the content of financial law, the other two being market practices and case law.

== History ==
Financial regulation has ancient roots, often evolving in response to economic crises or the need to standardize commerce. The Code of Hammurabi (c. 1700 BCE) contained standards for lending and the regulation of interest. In the Roman Empire, banking was expanded beyond temples into private and state roles. This led to the creation of distinct financial institutions subject to administrative oversight. During the medieval period, financial regulation in Europe was heavily influenced by religious restrictions on usury (the charging of interest), which shaped the development of early merchant banks in Italy.

In the early modern period, the Dutch were the pioneers in financial regulation. The first recorded ban (regulation) on short selling was enacted by the Dutch authorities as early as 1610.

== Aims of regulation ==
The objectives of financial regulators are usually:

- market confidence – to maintain confidence in the financial system
- financial stability – contributing to the protection and enhancement of stability of the financial system
- consumer protection – securing the appropriate degree of protection for consumers.
- reduce financial crime
- regulate foreign participation

== Structure of supervision ==
Acts empower organizations, government or non-government, to monitor activities and enforce actions. There are various setups and combinations in place for the financial regulatory structure around the globe.

=== Securities market regulation ===
Exchange acts ensure that trading on the floor of exchanges is conducted in a proper manner. Most prominent the pricing process, execution and settlement of trades, direct and efficient trade monitoring.

Financial regulators ensure that listed companies and market participants comply with various regulations under the trading acts. The trading acts demands that listed companies publish regular financial reports, ad hoc notifications or directors' dealings. Whereas market participants are required to publish major shareholder notifications. The objective of monitoring compliance by listed companies with their disclosure requirements is to ensure that investors have access to essential and adequate information for making an informed assessment of listed companies and their securities.

Asset management supervision or investment acts ensures the frictionless operation of those vehicles.

=== Supervision of banks and financial services providers ===
Banking acts lay down rules for banks which they have to observe when they are being established and when they are carrying on their business. These rules are designed to prevent unwelcome developments that might disrupt the smooth functioning of the banking system. Thus ensuring a strong and efficient banking system.

== See also ==
- Bank regulation
- Finance
- Financial economics § Financial markets
- Financial ethics
- Financial regulation in India
- Financial repression
- Global financial system
- Group of Thirty
- Insurance law
- International Organization of Securities Commissions
- International Centre for Financial Regulation
- LabEx ReFi - European Laboratory on Financial Regulation
- Macroprudential regulation
- Microprudential regulation
- Regulatory capture
- Regulatory economics
- Securities commission
- Commodity market § Regulation of commodity markets
- Virtual currency law in the United States
