= Fooled by Randomness =

Book by Nassim Nicholas Taleb

Fooled by Randomness: The Hidden Role of Chance in Life and in the Markets
- Author: Nassim Nicholas Taleb
- Language: English
- Series: Incerto
- Subject: Human knowledge, Statistics, Philosophy, Finance
- Publisher: Random House
- Publication date: 2001
- Publication place: United States
- Media type: Print, e-book
- Pages: 316
- ISBN: 0-8129-7521-9
- OCLC: 60349198
- Dewey Decimal: 123/.3 22
- LC Class: HG4521 .T285 2005
- Followed by: The Black Swan

Fooled by Randomness: The Hidden Role of Chance in Life and in the Markets is a book by Nassim Nicholas Taleb that deals with the fallibility of human knowledge. It was first published in 2001. Updated editions were released a few years later. The book is the first part of Taleb's multi-volume philosophical essay on uncertainty, titled the Incerto, which also includes The Black Swan (2007–2010), The Bed of Procrustes (2010–2016), Antifragile (2012), and Skin in the Game (2018).

== Thesis ==
Taleb sets forth the idea that modern humans are often unaware of the existence of randomness. They tend to explain random outcomes as non-random.

Human beings:

1. overestimate causality, e.g., they see elephants in the clouds instead of understanding that they are in fact randomly shaped clouds that appear to our eyes as elephants (or something else);
2. tend to view the world as more explainable than it really is. So they look for explanations even when there are none.

Other misperceptions of randomness that are discussed include:

- Survivorship bias. We see the winners and try to learn from them, while forgetting the huge number of losers.
- Skewed distributions. Many real life phenomena are not 50:50 bets like tossing a coin, but have various unusual and counter-intuitive distributions. An example of this is a 99:1 bet in which you almost always win, but when you lose, you lose all your savings. People can easily be fooled by statements like "I won this bet 50 times". According to Taleb: "Option sellers, it is said, eat like chickens and go to the bathroom like elephants", which is to say, option sellers may earn a steady small income from selling the options, but when a disaster happens they lose a fortune.

== Reaction ==
The book was selected by Fortune as one of the 75 "Smartest Books of All Time." U.S.A Today recounted that many criticisms raised in this book of the financial industry turned out to be justified. Forbes described the book as being playful, self-effacing and at times insufferably arrogant, but always thought-provoking. The New Yorker (one of the publications which receives more favourable comments in this book) said that the book was to conventional Wall Street wisdom what Martin Luther’s ninety-nine [sic] theses were to the Catholic Church.

== Editions ==
- In 2001, TEXERE published the first edition of the book. (ISBN 1-58799-071-7, London : Texere, 2001)
- In 2004, TEXERE published a revamped second edition.
- In 2005, Random House published a softback edition with more changes. (ISBN 1-58799-190-X, New York : Random house, 2005)
- In 2005, a French version appeared, with many unique changes.
- The book has been translated into 20 languages, and is reported to have sold over half a million copies.
- Further editions have been published by Penguin (softback, May 2007) and Random House (hardback, October 2008.)

== See also ==
- List of cognitive biases
- Ludic fallacy
- Pareidolia – the psychological phenomenon of perceiving patterns in randomness
