= Phony =

A phony is someone or something which is not sincere or not real.

Phony or phonies may also refer to:

- The Phonies, a Finnish rock band
- Phony (song), a Japanese song
- Phony (TV series), an American mystery TV series

== See also ==
- Fraud – intentional deception to gain unlawfully
