= Idyll Farms =

Goat farm and creamery in Michigan, US

Coordinates: 45.15219°N 85.62862°W

Idyll Farms, LLC
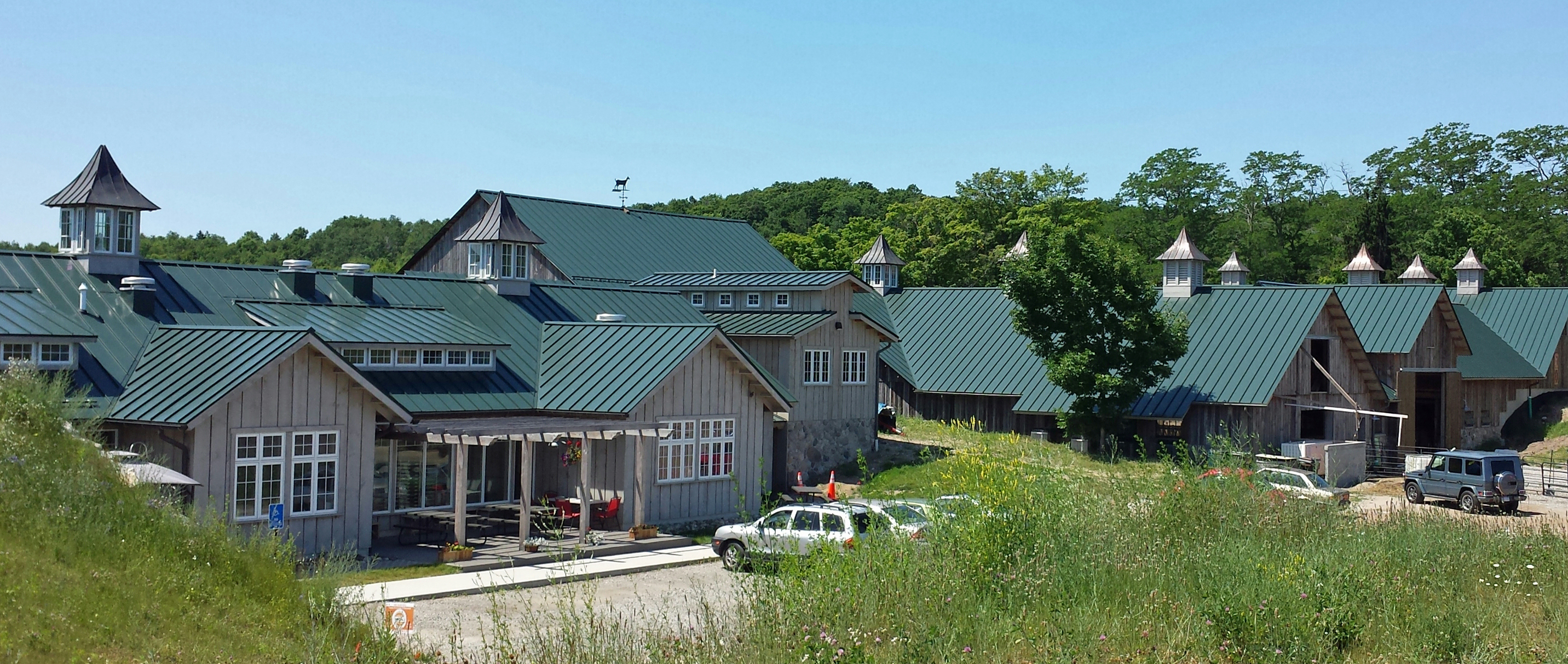
- Idyll Farms in Northport, Michigan
- Type: Private
- Industry: Cheesemaking, Agriculture
- Founded: 2012
- Headquarters: Northport, Michigan, U.S.
- Website: www.idyllfarms.com

Idyll Farms is a pasture-based goat farm and creamery in Northport, Michigan that produces artisanal farmstead chèvre.

== Operation ==
Idyll Farms’ Alpine goats are pasture-fed using rotational grazing practices.

== Ownership ==
The farm is owned by hedge fund manager Mark Spitznagel, who built the sustainable farm after acquiring its approximately 200 acres in 2010 in his hometown.

== Idyll Farms herd in Detroit ==
In June, 2014, Idyll Farms moved a herd of their wethers along with movable pens and electric fencing from Northport to the Brightmoor neighborhood of Detroit, under the stated objective to have the grazing goats clean up overgrown foliage and help the struggling community through agriculture, jobs, education, and self-sufficiency. The event drew national media attention but Detroit mayor Mike Duggan ordered the goats removed because of the city ordinance banning all livestock.

== Awards ==
The farm's cheeses have won awards at the World Championship Cheese Contest (including Best of Class) in 2016, as well as multiple and repeat awards (including in the broad all milk cheese category) at the American Cheese Society North American Competition in 2013, 2014 (the farm’s first two years of production), and 2016. Its cheeses were also named a “Best Artisanal Cheese” in Food & Wine magazine in 2016 and one of “The 49 Best American Cheeses” in Men’s Journal magazine.
