= Skin in the Game (book) =

2018 book by Nassim Nicholas Taleb

Skin in the Game: Hidden Asymmetries in Daily Life
- Author: Nassim Nicholas Taleb
- Language: English
- Series: Incerto
- Subject: Philosophy
- Publisher: Random House
- Publication date: February 27, 2018
- Publication place: United States
- Media type: Print, E-book, Audiobook
- Pages: 304
- ISBN: 978-0-425-28462-9 (Hardcover)
- Preceded by: Antifragile

Skin in the Game: Hidden Asymmetries in Daily Life (acronymed: SITG) is a 2018 nonfiction book by Nassim Nicholas Taleb, a former options trader with a background in the mathematics of probability and statistics.

Taleb's thesis is that skin in the game—i.e., having a shared risk when taking a major decision—is necessary for fairness, commercial efficiency, and risk management, as well as being necessary to understand the world. The book is part of Taleb's multi-volume philosophical essay on uncertainty, titled the Incerto, which also includes Fooled by Randomness (2001), The Black Swan (2007–2010), The Bed of Procrustes (2010–2016), and Antifragile (2012). The book is dedicated to "two men of courage": Ron Paul, "a Roman among Greeks"; and Ralph Nader, "Greco-Phoenician saint".

== Asymmetry and missing incentives ==
If an actor pockets some rewards from a policy they enact or support without accepting any of the risks, economists consider it to be a problem of "missing incentives". In contrast, to Taleb, the problem is more fundamentally one of asymmetry: one actor gets the rewards, the other is stuck with the risks.

Taleb argues that "For social justice, focus on symmetry and risk sharing. You cannot make profits and transfer the risks to others, as bankers and large corporations do... Forcing skin in the game corrects this asymmetry better than thousands of laws and regulations."

=== The centrality of negative incentives ===
Actors – per Taleb – must bear a cost when they fail the public. A fund manager that gets a percentage on wins, but no penalty for losing, is incentivized to gamble with his clients' funds. Bearing no downside for one's actions means that one has no "skin in the game", which is the source of many evils.

An evolutionary process is an additional argument for SITG. Those who err and have SITG will not survive; hence, evolutionary processes will eliminate (physically or figuratively by going bankrupt etc.) those tending to do stupid things. Without SITG, this process cannot work.

=== Examples ===
Robert Rubin, a highly-paid director and senior advisor at Citigroup, paid no financial penalty when Citigroup had to be rescued by U.S. taxpayers due to the 2008 financial crisis. Taleb calls this sort of a trade, with upside gain but no or limited downside risk, a "Bob Rubin trade".

Many war hawks do not themselves bear any risks of dying in a war they advocate.

== Intellectual Yet Idiot ==
Intellectual Yet Idiot (IYI) is a term coined by Taleb in his essay by the same name that refers to the semi-intelligent well-pedigreed "who are telling us 1) what to do, 2) what to eat, 3) how to speak, 4) how to think... and 5) who to vote for". They represent a very small minority of people but have an overwhelming impact on the vast majority because they affect government policy. IYI are often policy makers, academics, journalists, and media pundits.

The IYI pathologizes others for doing things he doesn't understand without ever realizing it is his understanding that may be limited. He thinks people should act according to their best interests and he knows their interests, particularly if they are "red necks" or English non-crisp-vowel class who voted for Brexit. When plebeians do something that makes sense to them, but not to him, the IYI uses the term "uneducated". What we generally call participation in the political process, he calls by two distinct designations: "democracy" when it fits the IYI, and "populism" when the plebeians dare voting in a way that contradicts his preferences.

Taleb points out that being educated and "intellectual" does not always mean that someone is not an idiot for most purposes. "You can be an intellectual yet still be an idiot. 'Educated philistines' have been wrong on everything from Stalinism to Iraq to low-carb diets."

Taleb dedicates a chapter to IYIs in the book.

=== Usage ===
The term was picked up and used late in the 2016 U.S. presidential election by Newt Gingrich when he criticized the negative response Trump received after the first presidential debate stating that "The Intellectual Yet Idiot class is so out of touch with America that they don't even realize how badly they are doing and how well Trump is doing." Gingrich has mentioned the term in interviews and speeches since then and has included in his book Understanding Trump a chapter called "The Rise of the IYI".

The term has since been used extensively and has been cited in numerous periodicals including The Guardian, Financial Times, and New Statesman. Jonah Goldberg, in an article from National Review, references the term in defense of non-liberal intellectuals who have been branded "anti-intellectual" by the Left. Graham Vyse, in his article "Democrats Should Stop Talking About Bipartisanship and Start Fighting" from The New Republic, referenced Gingrich's use of IYI as divisive and that until the Republicans become more collaborative, "Democrats need to drop the subject, too, and fight like hell instead."

== Other ideas ==
=== Minority rules ===
A "stubborn minority", accounting for as little as 4% of the population, can impose its will on the relatively uninterested majority. A halal eater, for example, will never eat non-halal food, but a non-halal eater is not banned from eating halal. Thus, a catering company switches to serving halal meat despite it being preferred only by a tiny minority of its customers. This happens because it is easier to switch to halal entirely than to have separate halal and non-halal options.

Taleb further argues that, for "transgenic" genetically modified crops to succeed commercially, more than 96% of the population would need to be convinced that they are safe. A "stubborn minority", of just 4%, that opposes GMO food is large enough to impose its will on the entire population.

Taleb explains that the process of "minority rule" is done incrementally. An example is given in the book: one stubborn daughter (who refuses to eat GMO food), who lives in a family, can cause her entire family to refuse GMO food simply by refusing GMO food herself. The family finds it easier to eat non-GMO food entirely than to cater separately to the daughter; the family effectively becomes entirely non-GMO-consuming. Similarly, because the family is known in the neighborhood to only consume non-GMO food, a local barbeque would serve only non-GMO food, thus influencing the entire neighborhood to only eat non-GMO food. In turn, local stores would only sell non-GMO food. Therefore, one person in a neighborhood can influence everyone through a stubborn choice.

=== Christology ===
The book delves into Christology. Michael Bonner writes: "Observers who are interested in, or baffled by, the Christological debates of the first five hundred years of Christianity may be shocked by Taleb's explanation for the Church's insistence upon the full humanity of Jesus. The short answer is that it was essential for God to have—literally—skin in the game, and that Christ's full participation in crucifixion, self-sacrifice, and death made him the archetypal risk-taker."

== Reception and criticism ==
Economist Branko Milanović wrote that Taleb has created "a full system that goes from empirics to ethics, a thing which is exceedingly rare in modern world." The Economist described reading the book as similar to "being trapped in a cab with a cantankerous and over-opinionated driver." Matthew Syed of The Times was "mostly persuaded" by the main argument of the book. The Guardian published an ambivalent review, noting that Taleb's "combination of fearlessness, self-belief and immodesty adds up to charisma on the page" but that "every idea that sounds as if it might work in the abstract fails in the particular". Taleb responded with a list of the flaws and "reading comprehension" in the reviews in The Economist and The Guardian (claiming that journalists have an agency problem with subjects criticizing their profession for lack of skin of the game).

=== Audiobook ===
The audiobook version is narrated by Joe Ochman and reached No. 4 on Audible.com's nonfiction list in March 2018.
