= Hélyette Geman =

French academic

- Citizenship: French, American
- Education: École Normale Supérieure; Pierre and Marie Curie University; Pantheon-Sorbonne University
- Awards: IAQF Financial Engineer of the Year
- Scientific career
- Fields: Probability Theory, Mathematical Finance, AI and Finance, Commodities, Energy (Crude oil, Natural Gas, Electricity).
- Workplaces: Johns Hopkins University; previous: Birbeck, University of London; Paris Dauphine; ESSEC.
- Thesis: Contribution à l’Etude des Convergences Stochastiques des Mesures Aléatoires (1976); L'Importance de la Probabilité Forward Neutre dans une Approche Stochastique des Taux d'Intérêt (1990)
- Doctoral students: Nassim Nicholas Taleb
- Website: helyettegeman.com

Hélyette Geman is a French academic in mathematical finance. In 2022, she became the first woman in 31 years to be named ‘Financial Engineer of the Year’ by the International Association of Quantitative Finance. Her career has spanned several sub-disciplines, including probability theory, transaction clock, and the finance of commodities and energy. Her academic institutions include ESSEC Business School, the University Paris Dauphine (Director of Master 203), and Birkbeck, University of London. She is currently a research professor at Johns Hopkins University and a senior fellow in the think tank Policy Center for the New South.

== Notable Research and Activities ==
Helyette Geman is most known for:

- Having been the first to formally introduce the Forward Measure for the valuation of interest rate derivatives and the extension to stochastic interest rates of major option pricing formulas.
- Having coined the term Numéraire in the context of pricing options written on complex underlyings and exhibiting hedging strategies in terms of the numeraire.
- Having uncovered a stochastic clock driven by order flow arriving in the market, leading to the normality of asset returns.
- Her role in creating, with Marc Yor, the sought-after master's program, jointly operated by the French Universities École Polytechnique, Pierre and Marie Curie University, and ESSEC Business School.
- Pricing Catastrophe Futures and Options using Bessel Processes.
- Her work on probability distributions, specifically the "CGMY" Lévy process named after Carr, Helyette Geman, Madan and Yor.
- Her 2005 book on Commodities Derivatives.
- Having Organized in June 2000 the First Bachelier World Congress with Professors Paul Samuelson, Robert Merton, and Henri McKean.
- Her book 'Insurance, Weather and Electricity Derivatives: From Exotic Options to Exotic Underlyings', 1999, Risk Books.
- Her work on 'Bitcoins and Commodities'
- Being the PhD supervisor of Nassim Nicholas Taleb.

== Selected publications ==
- Changes of Numeraire, Changes of Probability Measure and Option Pricing, with Nicole El Karoui, Jean-Charles Rochet. Journal of Applied Probability, Vol. 32, No. 2 (Jun., 1995), pp. 443–458
- The Fine Structure of Asset Returns: An Empirical Investigation, with Peter Carr, Dilip B. Madan, and Marc Yor. The Journal of Business 75 (2) (April 2002): 305–332.
- Order Flow, Transaction Clock and Normality of Asset Returns, Journal of Finance, Oct 2000, Vol 55, pp. 2259-2284
- Stochastic Time Changes in Catastrophe Option Pricing Insurance, Mathematics and Economics, Dec 1997, Vol 21, pp. 185-193.

== Awards ==
- 2022 IAQF/Northfield Financial Engineer of the Year Award
- Member of Honour - French Society of Actuaries
- Energy Risk - Hall of Fame.
