= The Black Swan: The Impact of the Highly Improbable =

2007 book by Nassim Nicholas Taleb

The Black Swan
- Hardcover first edition
- Author: Nassim Nicholas Taleb
- Language: English
- Series: Incerto
- Subject: Epistemology, philosophy of science, randomness
- Genre: Non-fiction
- Publisher: Random House (U.S.) Allen Lane (U.K.)
- Publication date: April 17, 2007
- Publication place: United States
- Media type: Print, e-book
- Pages: 400 pp (hardcover)
- ISBN: 978-1400063512 (U.S.), ISBN 978-0713999952 (U.K.)
- OCLC: 71833470
- Dewey Decimal: 003/.54 22
- LC Class: Q375 .T35 2007
- Preceded by: Fooled by Randomness
- Followed by: The Bed of Procrustes

The Black Swan: The Impact of the Highly Improbable is a 2007 book by Nassim Nicholas Taleb, who is a former options trader. The book focuses on the extreme impact of rare and unpredictable outlier events—and the human tendency to find simplistic explanations for these events, retrospectively. Taleb calls this the Black Swan theory.

The book covers subjects relating to knowledge, aesthetics, as well as ways of life, and uses elements of fiction and anecdotes from the author's life to elaborate his theories. It spent 36 weeks on the New York Times best-seller list.

The book is part of Taleb's five-volume series, titled the Incerto, including Fooled by Randomness (2001), The Black Swan (2007–2010), The Bed of Procrustes (2010–2016), Antifragile (2012), and Skin in the Game (2018).

== Coping with Black Swan events ==
A central idea in Taleb's book is not to attempt to predict Black Swan events, but to build robustness to negative events and an ability to exploit positive events. "Robustness" reflects an attitude where nothing is permitted to fail under conditions of change. Taleb contends that banks and trading firms are vulnerable to hazardous Black Swan events and are exposed to losses beyond those predicted by their defective financial models.

The book asserts that a "Black Swan" event depends on the observer: for example, what may be a Black Swan surprise for a turkey is not a Black Swan surprise for its butcher. Hence the objective should be to "avoid being the turkey", by identifying areas of vulnerability in order to "turn the Black Swans white".

== Summary ==
Taleb has referred to the book as an essay or a narrative with one single idea: "our blindness with respect to randomness, particularly large deviations." The book moves from literary subjects in the beginning to scientific and mathematical subjects in the later portions. Part One and the beginning of Part Two delve into psychology. Taleb addresses science and business in the latter half of Part Two and Part Three. Part Four contains advice on how to approach the world in the face of uncertainty and still enjoy life.

Taleb acknowledges a contradiction in the book. He uses an exact metaphor, the Black Swan idea to argue against the "unknown, the abstract, and imprecise uncertain—white ravens, pink elephants, or evaporating denizens of a remote planet orbiting Tau Ceti."

There is a contradiction; this book is a story, and I prefer to use stories and vignettes to illustrate our gullibility about stories and our preference for the dangerous compression of narratives.... You need a story to displace a story. Metaphors and stories are far more potent (alas) than ideas; they are also easier to remember and more fun to read.

=== Part one: Umberto Eco's antilibrary, or how we seek validation ===
In the first chapter, the Black Swan theory is first discussed in relation to Taleb's coming of age in the Levant. The author then elucidates his approach to historical analysis. He describes history as opaque, essentially a black box of cause and effect. One sees events go in and events go out, but one has no way of determining which produced what effect. Taleb argues this is due to Triplet of Opacity (an illusion of understanding in which we think we understand a complicated world).

The second chapter discusses a fictional neuroscientist named Yevgenia Nikolayevna Krasnova, who writes a book named A Story of Recursion. She is repeatedly insulted and rejected by publishers. This rejection is, in part, due to the fact that the book appears to defy characterization: it does not have a clear bookstore category, nor is it definitively "fiction" or "non-fiction". She published her book on the web and was discovered by a small publishing company; they published her unedited work and the book became an international bestseller. The small publishing firm became a big corporation, and Krasnova became famous. Her next book fails. In sum, she experienced two black swans.

The third chapter introduces the concepts of Extremistan and Mediocristan to classify data sets, such as human height and net-worth. In Mediocristan data-sets, extreme events are very rare and are increasingly constricted past a certain threshold. Due to this, an "extreme" measurement within Mediocristan will not skew the average much. Human height is an example of a Mediocristan data-set. The average height of a United States man is around 5 feet and 9 inches (175.3 centimetres) and there are only around 3,000 people in the world who are 7 feet tall (or taller) - these would generally not skew the average measurement. Even the tallest recorded person, Robert Wadlow, was only 2 feet and 2 inches higher than the average. By contrast, in Extremistan, extreme events are not increasingly constricted: the median net-worth of a United States citizen is around $192,000, yet the median net-worth of the "top 1%" is around $13 million. The 5 people with the highest net-worth all have over $200 billion. If a single ultra-wealthy person is included in a net-worth sample, this can skew the average massively. (If human height was an Extremistan-style data-set, it could allow for the tallest 1% of people to be around 389 feet and 4 inches (118.669 metres, or almost 0.119 kilometres)) tall.

Taleb uses the two concepts as guides to define the predictability of the environment one is studying. Mediocristan environments can safely use Gaussian distribution. In Extremistan environments, a Gaussian distribution cannot be used due to the huge impact of rare events. In this part he quotes Benoit Mandelbrot and his critique of the Gaussian distribution.

Chapter four brings together the topics discussed earlier into a narrative about a turkey before Thanksgiving who is fed and treated well for many consecutive days. The turkey is led to believe that it will be fed and treated well for many more consecutive days. Shortly afterward, however, it is slaughtered and served as a meal. Taleb uses it to illustrate the philosophical problem of induction and how past performance is no indicator of future performance. He then takes the reader into the history of skepticism.

In chapter nine, Taleb outlines the multiple topics he previously has described and connects them as a single basic idea. In chapter thirteen, the book discusses what can be done regarding "epistemic arrogance", which occurs whenever people begin to think they know more than they actually do. He recommends avoiding unnecessary dependence on large-scale harmful predictions, while being less cautious with smaller matters, such as going to a picnic. He makes a distinction between the American cultural perception of failure versus European and Asian stigma and embarrassment regarding failure: the latter is more tolerable for people taking small risks. He also describes the "barbell strategy" for investment that he used as a trader, which consists in avoiding medium risk investments and putting 85–90% of money in the safest instruments available and the remaining 10–15% on extremely speculative bets.

== Argument ==
The term black swan was a Latin expression: its oldest reference is in the poet Juvenal's expression that "a good person is as rare as a black swan" ("rara avis in terris nigroque simillima cygno", 6.165). It was a common expression in 16th century London, as a statement that describes impossibility, deriving from the old world presumption that 'all swans must be white', because all historical records of swans reported that they had white feathers. Thus, the black swan is an oft cited reference in philosophical discussions of the improbable. Aristotle's "Prior Analytics" is the most likely original reference that makes use of example syllogisms involving the predicates "white", "black", and "swan." More specifically, Aristotle uses the white swan as an example of necessary relations and the black swan as improbable. This example may be used to demonstrate either deductive or inductive reasoning; however, neither form of reasoning is infallible, since in inductive reasoning, the premises of an argument may support a conclusion, but do not ensure it, and similarly, in deductive reasoning, an argument is dependent on the truth of its premises. That is, a false premise may lead to a false result and inconclusive premises also will yield an inconclusive conclusion. The limits of the argument behind "all swans are white" is exposed—it merely is based on the limits of experience (e.g., that every swan one has seen, heard, or read about is white). The point of this metaphor is that all known swans were white until the discovery of black swans in Australia. Hume's attack against induction and causation is based primarily on the limits of everyday experience and so too, the limitations of scientific knowledge.

== Reception ==
The book has been described by The Sunday Times as one of the twelve most influential books since World War II. As of December 2020, it has been cited approximately 10,633 times, 9,000 of which are for the English-language edition. The book spent 36 weeks on the New York Times Best Seller List; 17 as hardcover and 19 weeks as paperback. It was published in 32 languages.

Mathematics professor David Aldous argued that "Taleb is sensible (going on prescient) in his discussion of financial markets and in some of his general philosophical thought, but tends toward irrelevance or ridiculous exaggeration otherwise." Gregg Easterbrook wrote a critical review of The Black Swan in the New York Times to which Taleb replied with a list of logical errors, blaming Easterbrook for not having read the book. Giles Foden, writing for The Guardian in 2007, described the book as insightful, but facetiously written, saying that Taleb's "dumbed-down" style was a central problem, especially in comparison to his earlier book, Fooled by Randomness. The Nobel Prize–winning psychologist Daniel Kahneman wrote "The Black Swan changed my view of how the world works" and explains the influence in his own 2011 book Thinking, Fast and Slow.

== See also ==
- Antifragility
- Apophasis
- Baryon asymmetry
- Benoit Mandelbrot
- Black swan emblems and popular culture
- Cognitive bias
- Confirmation bias
- Efficient-market hypothesis
- Falsifiability
- Illusory correlation
- Raven paradox
- Sextus Empiricus
