= Nassim Nicholas Taleb =

Lebanese-American author (born 1960)

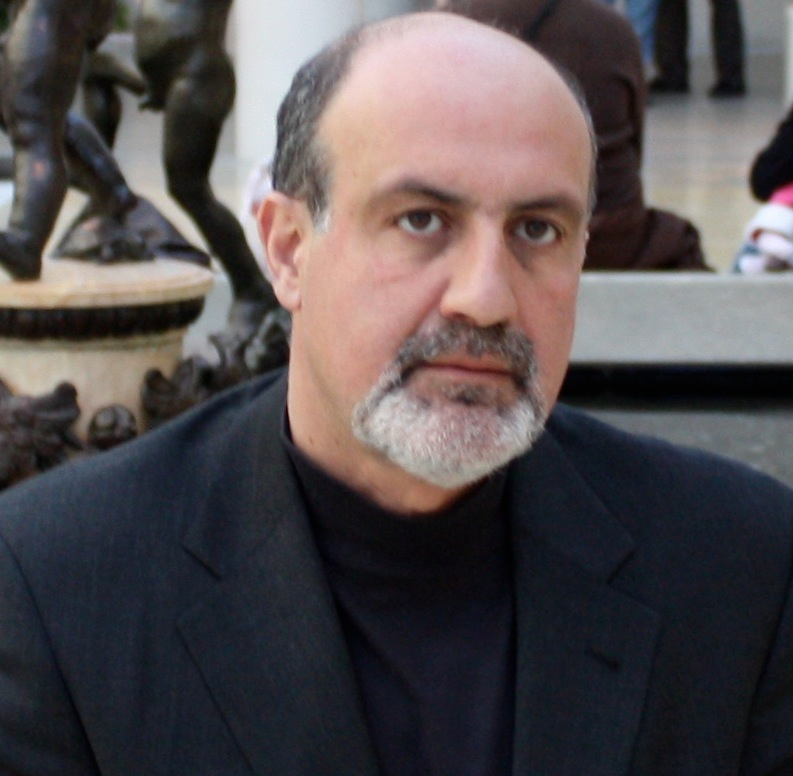
- Taleb in 2010
- Born: 12 September 1960 (age 66); Amioun, Lebanon
- Education: University of Paris (BS, MS); University of Pennsylvania (MBA); Paris Dauphine University (PhD)
- Known for: Applied epistemology, antifragility, black swan theory, ludic fallacy, antilibrary
- Awards: Bruno Leoni Award, Wolfram Innovator Award
- Scientific career
- Fields: decision theory, risk, probability
- Workplaces: New York University; University of Massachusetts Amherst
- Thesis: The Microstructure of Dynamic Hedging (1998)
- Doctoral advisor: Hélyette Geman
- Website: fooledbyrandomness.com

Nassim Nicholas Taleb (Note: Arabic: نسيم نقولا طالب) (/ˈtɑːləb/; born 12 September 1960) is a Lebanese-American university professor, essayist, mathematical statistician, former option trader, risk analyst, and aphorist. His work concerns problems of randomness, probability, complexity, and uncertainty.

Taleb wrote Incerto, a five-volume work on the nature of uncertainty published between 2001 and 2018 which includes the notable volumes The Black Swan and Antifragile. He has taught at several universities, serving as a Distinguished Professor of Risk Engineering at the New York University Tandon School of Engineering since September 2008. He has also been a practitioner of mathematical finance and is currently an adviser at Universa Investments. The Sunday Times described his 2007 book The Black Swan as one of the 12 most influential books since World War II.

Taleb criticized risk management methods used by the finance industry and warned about financial crises, subsequently profiting from 1987's Black Monday, and later from the 2008 financial crisis. He advocates what he calls a "black swan robust" society, meaning a society that can withstand difficult-to-predict events. He proposes what he has termed "antifragility" in systems; that is, an ability to benefit and grow from a certain class of random events, errors, and volatility, as well as "convex tinkering" as a method of scientific discovery, by which he means that decentralized experimentation outperforms directed research.

== Early life and family background ==
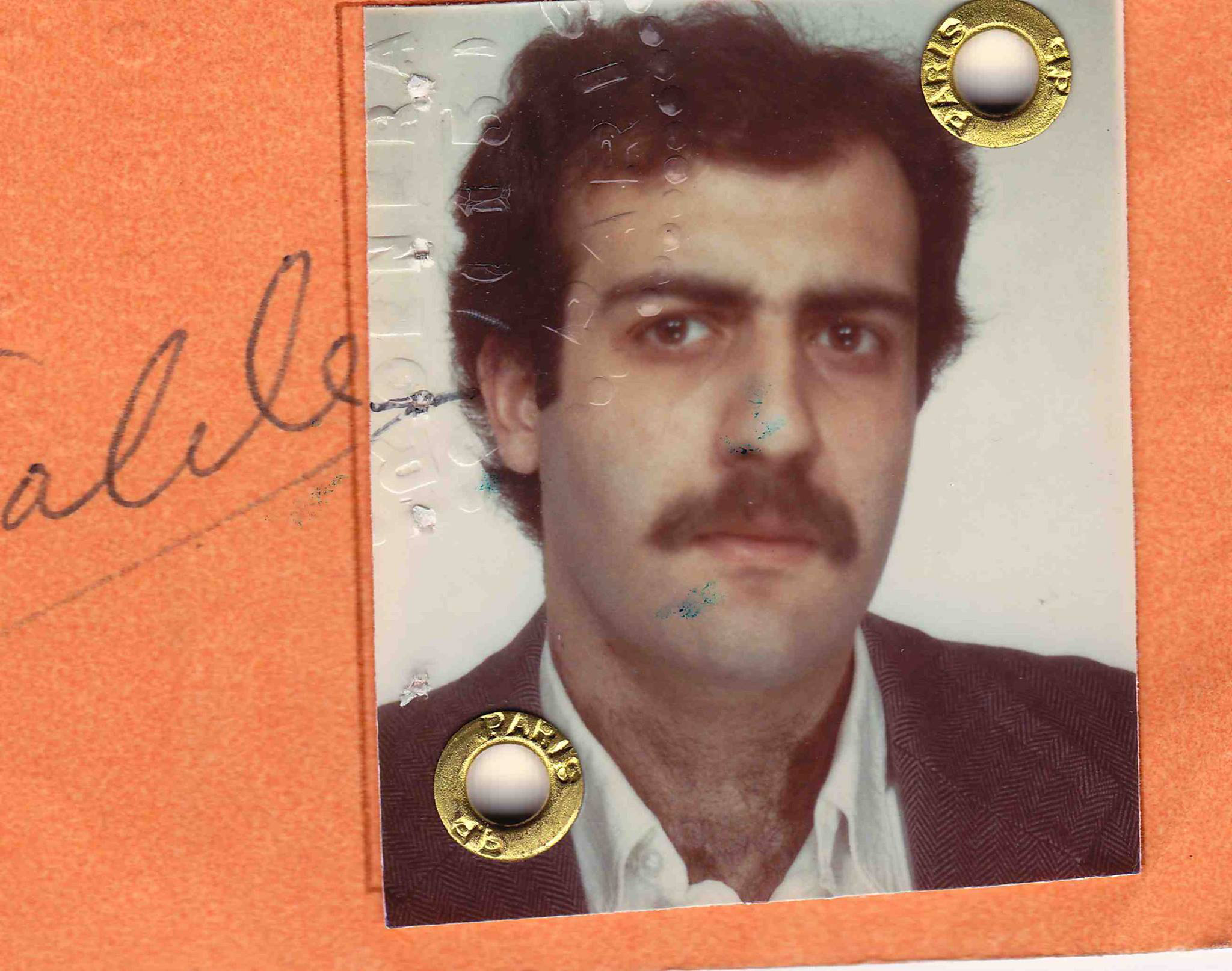
Taleb as a student

Taleb was born in Amioun, Lebanon, to Minerva Ghosn and Nagib Taleb, an oncologist and a researcher in anthropology. His rich and influential parents were Lebanese Greek Orthodox Christians, and had French citizenship. His maternal grandfather Fouad Nicolas Ghosn and great-grandfather Nicolas Ghosn were both deputy prime ministers of Lebanon in the 1940s through the 1970s, and his four-times great-grandfather was one of the board of directors to the administrator of Mount Lebanon. His paternal grandfather Nassim Taleb was a supreme court judge. Taleb attended a French school in Beirut, the Grand Lycée Franco-Libanais. His family saw its political prominence and wealth reduced by the Lebanese Civil War, which began in 1975. He is a Greek Orthodox Christian.

== Education ==
Taleb received Bachelor and Master of Science degrees from the University of Paris. He holds an MBA from the Wharton School at the University of Pennsylvania (1983), and a PhD in management science from the University of Paris (Dauphine) (1998), under the direction of Hélyette Geman. His dissertation focused on the mathematics of derivatives pricing.

== Career ==
=== Finance ===
Taleb has been a practitioner of mathematical finance as a hedge fund manager, and a derivatives trader. He has held the following positions: managing director and proprietary trader at UBS, currency trader at Credit Suisse First Boston, chief currency derivatives trader for Banque Indosuez, managing director and worldwide head of financial option arbitrage at CIBC Wood Gundy, derivatives arbitrage trader at Bankers Trust (now Deutsche Bank), proprietary trader at BNP Paribas, independent option market maker on the Chicago Mercantile Exchange and hedge fund manager for Empirica Capital.

Taleb reportedly became financially independent after the crash of 1987 from his hedged short Eurodollar position while working as a trader for First Boston. Next, Taleb pursued work toward his PhD in Paris, completing the degree program in 1998. He returned to New York City and founded Empirica Capital in 1999. During the market downturn in 2000, at the end of the dot com bubble and burst, Empirica's Empirica Kurtosis LLC fund was reported to have made a 56.86% return. Taleb's investing strategies continued to be highly successful during the Nasdaq dive in 2000. Several consecutive years of low market volatility and less spectacular returns followed, and Empirica closed in 2004. In 2007, Taleb joined his former Empirica partner, Mark Spitznagel, as an adviser to Universa Investments, an asset management company based on the "black swan" idea, owned and managed by Spitznagel in Miami, Florida.

Taleb attributed the 2008 financial crisis to the mismatch between reality and statistical distributions used in finance. Taleb's investing approach produced significant returns once again, with some Universa funds returning 65% to 115% in October 2008. In a 2007 Wall Street Journal article, Taleb claimed he retired from trading and would be a full-time author. He describes the nature of his involvement as "totally passive" from 2010 on. The Wall Street Journal journalist Scott Patterson wrote that "Taleb's involvement with Universa made him fabulously wealthy, the cash from the fund far outdistancing the substantial profits from his bestsellers".

Taleb considers himself less a businessman than an epistemologist of randomness, and says that he used trading to attain independence and freedom from authority. He advocated for tail risk hedging, which is intended to mitigate investors' exposure to extreme market moves. Tail risk hedging safeguards investors by reaping rewards from rare events, thus Taleb's investment management career has included several jackpots followed by lengthy dry spells.

At the World Economic Forum annual meeting in Davos in 2009, Taleb had harsh words for bankers, suggesting that bankers' recklessness will not be repeated "if you have punishment".

=== Academia ===
Taleb shifted his career emphasis to mathematical research in 2006. Since 2008, he has taught classes at New York University Tandon School of Engineering, as Distinguished Professor of Risk Engineering. and was a Distinguished Research Scholar at the Said Business School BT Center, University of Oxford from 2009 to 2013. Taleb also held positions at NYU's Courant Institute of Mathematical Sciences, the University of Massachusetts Amherst, and the London Business School.

Taleb has been Co-Editor in Chief of the academic journal Risk and Decision Analysis since September 2014, jointly teaches regular courses with Paul Wilmott in London, and occasionally participates in teaching courses toward the Certificate in Quantitative Finance. He is also a faculty member of the New England Complex Systems Institute.

=== Writing career ===
Taleb's first non-technical book, Fooled by Randomness, about the underestimation of the role of randomness in life, published in 2001, was selected by Fortune as one of the smartest 75 books known.

His second non-technical book, The Black Swan, about unpredictable events, was published in 2007, selling close to three million copies, as of February 2011. It spent 36 weeks on the New York Times Bestseller list, 17 as hardcover and 19 weeks as paperback, and was translated into 50 languages. The book has been credited with predicting the 2008 financial crisis.

In a 2008 article in The Times, journalist Bryan Appleyard described Taleb as "the hottest thinker in the world". Daniel Kahneman proposed the inclusion of Taleb's name among the world's top intellectuals, saying "Taleb has changed the way many people think about uncertainty, particularly in the financial markets. His book, The Black Swan, is an original and audacious analysis of the ways in which humans try to make sense of unexpected events."

A book of aphorisms, The Bed of Procrustes: Philosophical and Practical Aphorisms, was released in December 2010.

Antifragile: Things That Gain from Disorder was published in November 2012 and Skin in the Game: Hidden Asymmetries in Daily Life was published in February 2018.

Taleb's five volume philosophical essay on uncertainty, titled Incerto, includes Fooled by Randomness (2001), The Black Swan (2007–2010), The Bed of Procrustes (2010), Antifragile (2012), and Skin in the Game (2018). It was originally published in November 2016 including only the first four books. The fifth book was added in August 2019.

Taleb's non-technical writing style has been described as mixing a narrative, often semi-autobiographical style with short philosophical tales and historical and scientific commentary. The sales of Taleb's first two books garnered an advance of $4 million, for a follow-up book on anti-fragility.

== Ideas and theories ==
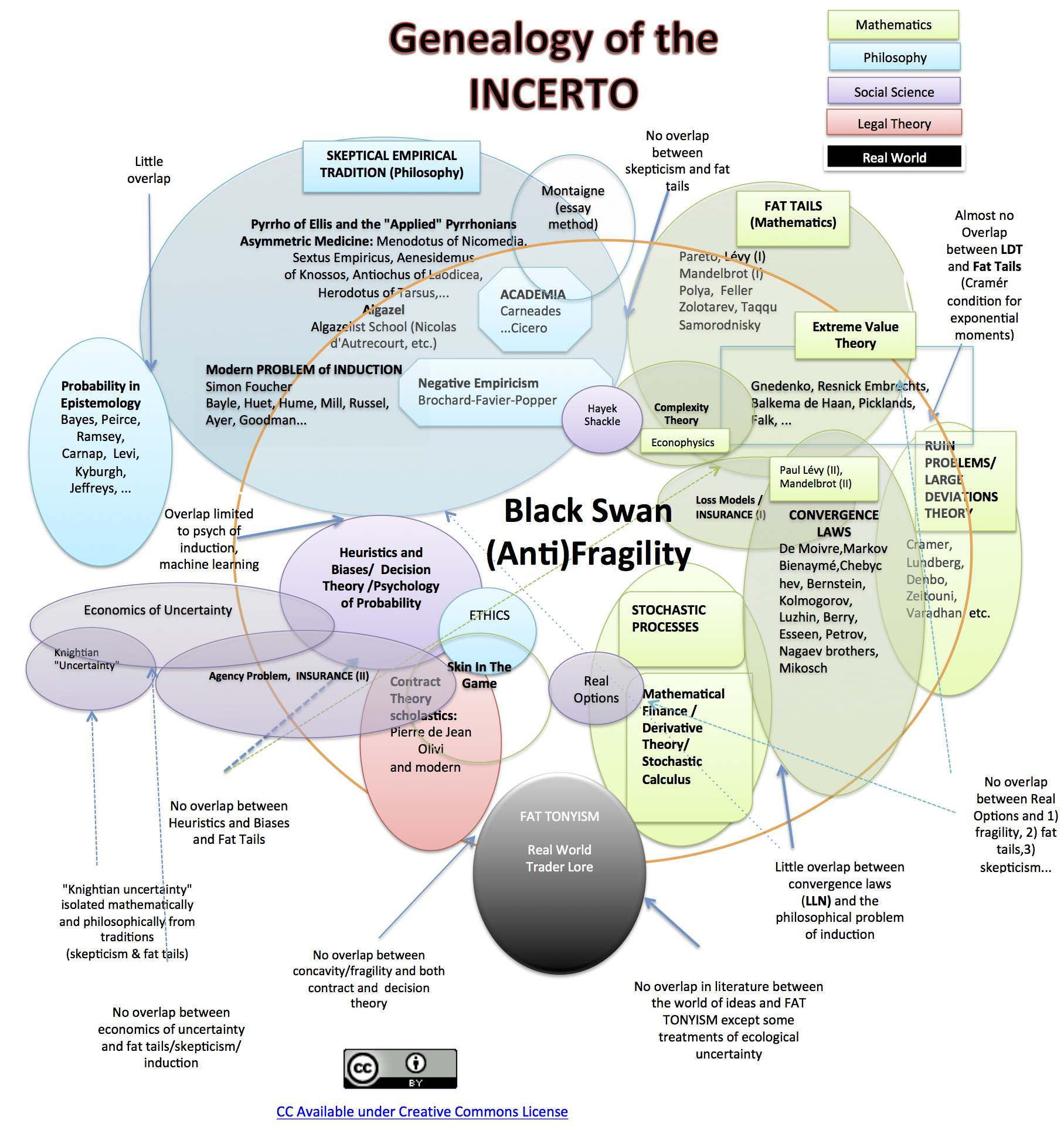
Genealogy map of topics treated by Nassim Taleb, by the author himself

Taleb's book The Bed of Procrustes summarizes the central problem: "we humans, facing limits of knowledge, and things we do not observe, the unseen and the unknown, resolve the tension by squeezing life and the world into crisp commoditized ideas". Taleb disagrees with Platonic (i.e., theoretical) approaches to reality to the extent that they lead people to have the wrong map of reality, rather than no map at all. He opposes most economic and grand social science theorizing, which in his view, suffers acutely from the problem of overuse of Plato's theory of forms.

He has also proposed that biological, economic, and other systems exhibit an ability to benefit and grow from volatility—including particular types of random errors and events—a characteristic of these systems that he terms antifragility. Relatedly, he also believes that universities are better at public relations and claiming credit than generating knowledge. He argues that knowledge and technology are usually generated by what he calls "stochastic tinkering" rather than by top-down directed research, and has proposed option-like experimentation as a way to outperform directed research as a method of scientific discovery, an approach he terms convex tinkering.

Taleb has called for discontinuation of the Nobel Prize in Economics, saying that the damage from economic theories can be devastating. He opposes top-down knowledge as an academic illusion. Together with Espen Gaarder Haug, Taleb asserts that option pricing is determined in a "heuristic way" by market participants, not by a model, and that models are "lecturing birds on how to fly". Teacher and author Pablo Triana has explored this topic with reference to Haug and Taleb. Triana has stated that Taleb might be correct in recommending that retail banks be treated as utilities, i.e. forbidden to take potentially disastrous risks, whereas hedge funds and other less-regulated investment entities need not be subject to similar restrictions.

In his writings, Taleb has identified and discussed the error of comparing real-world randomness with the "structured randomness" in quantum physics (where probabilities are computable) or games of chance such as casino gambling, in which the probabilities are purposefully constructed by casino management. Taleb calls this the "ludic fallacy". He argues that predictive models suffer from Platonism, gravitating towards mathematical purity and failing to take certain key ideas into account such as the impossibility of possessing all relevant information; that small unknown variations in the data can have a huge impact; and flawed theories/models based on empirical data and that fail to consider events that have not taken place but could take place. Discussing the ludic fallacy in The Black Swan, he writes, "The dark side of the moon is harder to see; beaming light on it costs energy. In the same way, beaming light on the unseen is costly, in both computational and mental effort."

In the second edition of The Black Swan, he posited that the foundations of quantitative economics are faulty and highly self-referential. He states that statistics is fundamentally incomplete as a field, as it cannot predict the risk of rare events, a problem that is acute in proportion to the rarity of these events. With the mathematician Raphael Douady, he called the problem statistical undecidability (Douady and Taleb, 2010).

Taleb has described his main challenge as mapping his ideas of "robustification" and "antifragility", that is, how to live and act in a world we do not understand and build robustness to black swan events. Taleb introduced the idea of the "fourth quadrant" in the exposure domain. One of its applications is in his definition of the most effective (that is, least fragile) risk management approach: what he calls the "barbell strategy" which is based on avoiding the middle in favor of linear combination of extremes, across all domains from politics to economics to one's personal life. These are deemed by Taleb to be more robust to estimation errors. For instance, he suggests that investing money in 'medium risk' investments is pointless, because risk is difficult, if not impossible to compute. His preferred strategy is to be both hyper-conservative and hyper-aggressive at the same time. For example, an investor might put 80 to 90% of their money in extremely safe instruments, such as treasury bills, with the remainder going into highly risky and diversified speculative bets. An alternative suggestion is to engage in highly speculative bets with a limited downside.

Taleb asserts that by adopting these strategies, a portfolio can be "robust", i.e. gain a positive exposure to black swan events while limiting losses suffered by such random events. Together with Donald Geman and Hélyette Geman, he modeled a maximum entropy barbell "to constrain only what can be constrained (in a robust manner) and to maximize entropy elsewhere", based on an insight by E. T. Jaynes that economic life increases in entropy under regulatory and other constraints. Taleb also applies a similar barbell-style approach to health and exercise. Instead of doing steady and moderate exercise daily, he suggests that it is better to do a low-effort exercise such as walking slowly most of the time, while occasionally expending extreme effort. He claims that the human body evolved to live in a random environment, with various unexpected but intense efforts and much rest.

Taleb appeared with Ron Paul and Ralph Nader on their respective shows in support of Skin in the Game, which was dedicated to both men. After the 2022 invasion of Ukraine, however, Taleb publicly supported an aggressive response against Russia and denounced "naive libertarians, who think I'm like them because they like my books."

Taleb wrote in Antifragile and in scientific papers that if the statistical structure of habits in modern society differ too greatly from the ancestral environment of humanity, the analysis of consumption should focus less on composition and more on frequency. In other words, studies that ignore the random nature of supply of nutrients are invalid.

Taleb's scathing counter-intuitive takedown of widely circulated alt-right talking points about race and IQ received both criticism and praise, when he published his "IQ is largely a pseudo-scientific swindle" on Medium. Posting a video on YouTube on the same topic, Taleb demonstrates that IQ as a test does not measure intelligence, which is a multi-factor phenomenon, but rather tests for the "absence of stupidity" or the "presence of unintelligence". Taleb argues in the paper that not only is IQ unscientific, and not validated by any evidence, it is additionally immoral and racist, calling national IQ rankings "a complete fraud."

Taleb authored a paper with Yaneer Bar-Yam and Joseph Norman called Systemic risk of pandemic via novel pathogens – Coronavirus: A note. The paper, published on 26 January 2020, took the position that the SARS-CoV-2 was not being taken seriously enough by policy makers and medical professionals.

== Criticism and reactions ==
Aaron Brown, a quantitative analyst and adjunct professor, said regarding The Black Swan that "the book reads as if Taleb has never heard of nonparametric methods, data analysis, visualization tools or robust estimation." Nonetheless, he calls the book "essential reading" and urges statisticians to overlook the insults to get the "important philosophic and mathematical truths." Taleb replied in the second edition of The Black Swan that "One of the most common (but useless) comments I hear is that some solutions can come from 'robust statistics.' I wonder how using these techniques can create information where there is none". In 2007, Westfall and Hilbe complained that Taleb's criticism is "often unfounded and sometimes outrageous." Taleb, writes John Kay, "describes writers and professionals as knaves or fools, mostly fools ... Yet beneath his rage and mockery are serious issues. The risk management models in use today exclude the very events against which they claim to protect the businesses that employ them. These models import a veneer of technical sophistication ... " Berkeley statistician David Freedman said that efforts by statisticians to refute Taleb's stance have been unconvincing.

Taleb contends that statisticians can be pseudoscientists when it comes to risks of rare events and risks of blowups, and mask their incompetence with complicated equations. This stance has attracted criticism: the American Statistical Association devoted the August 2007 issue of The American Statistician to The Black Swan. The magazine offered a mixture of praise and criticism for Taleb's main points, with a focus on Taleb's writing style and his representation of the statistical literature. Robert Lund, a mathematics professor at Clemson University, writes that in Black Swan, Taleb is "reckless at times and subject to grandiose overstatements; the professional statistician will find the book ubiquitously naive." However, Lund acknowledges that "there are many points where I agree with Taleb," and writes that "the book is a must" for anyone "remotely interested in finance and/or philosophical probability."

Taleb and Nobel laureate Myron Scholes have traded personal attacks, particularly after Taleb's paper with Espen Gaarder Haug, in which Taleb alleged that nobody uses the Black–Scholes–Merton formula. Taleb accused Scholes of being responsible for the 2008 financial crisis, and suggested that "this guy should be in a retirement home doing Sudoku. His funds have blown up twice. He shouldn't be allowed in Washington to lecture anyone on risk." Scholes retorted that Taleb simply "popularises ideas and is making money selling books". Scholes claimed that Taleb does not cite previous literature, and for this reason Taleb is not taken seriously in academia. Haug and Taleb (2011) listed hundreds of research documents showing the Black–Scholes formula was not derived by Scholes, and argued that the economics establishment ignored literature by practitioners and mathematicians such as Ed Thorp, who, many years earlier, had developed a more sophisticated version of the formula.

Taleb's outspoken and directed commentary against parts of the finance industry—e.g., saying at Davos in 2009 that he was "happy" that Lehman Brothers collapsed—was followed by reports of threats and personal attacks.

Taleb is known for his strong, and sometimes personal, criticisms of public figures and institutions. He has referred to former UK prime minister Tony Blair as "a very dishonourable fellow" and Blair's successor, Gordon Brown as "an idiot". He has criticized prominent economists like Larry Summers, Paul Krugman and Joseph Stiglitz, stating that "they cause more crises than they solve". He has also been critical of the World Economic Forum at Davos, calling it the "International Association of Namedroppers" and stating "they think it's their mission to solve a problem they don't understand."

== Personal life ==
Taleb has had non-smoking-related throat cancer. Taleb married Cynthia Shelton in 1988. He has a son and a daughter.

A polyglot, Taleb is fluent in French, English, and Classical and Lebanese Arabic. He also speaks Italian and Spanish, and reads classical texts in Greek, Latin, Aramaic, Ancient Hebrew, and Canaanite script.

According to the United States Justice Department records, Taleb repeatedly declined meeting Jeffrey Epstein and attending his parties, claiming he "smelled a rat". Epstein confirmed that they "never met".

== Recognition and honors ==
- 2009: Forbes magazine list of "Most Influential Management Gurus"
- 2011: Bloomberg 50 most influential people in global finance
- 2013, 2014, 2015: Most influential 100 thought leaders in the world by the Gottlieb Duttweiler Institute
- 2016: Delivered the 2016 commencement speech at the American University of Beirut.
- 2018: Wolfram Innovator Award for contributions to decision making under complicated and less-idealized probabilistic structures using Mathematica.

== Bibliography ==
=== Books ===
==== Incerto series ====
Incerto is a group of works by Taleb as philosophical essays on uncertainty. It was bundled into a group of four works in November 2016 ISBN 978-0399590450. A fifth book, Skin in the Game, was published in February 2018. This fifth book is bundled with the other four works in July 2019 as Incerto (Deluxe Edition) ISBN 978-1984819819.

- Fooled by Randomness: The Hidden Role of Chance in Life and in the Markets. New York: Random House. 2001. ISBN 978-0-8129-7521-5. Second ed., 2005. ISBN 1-58799-190-X.
- The Black Swan: The Impact of the Highly Improbable. New York: Random House and Penguin Books. 2007. ISBN 978-1-4000-6351-2. Expanded 2nd ed, 2010 ISBN 978-0812973815.
- The Bed of Procrustes: Philosophical and Practical Aphorisms. New York: Random House. 2010. ISBN 978-1-4000-6997-2. Expanded 2nd ed, 2016 ISBN 978-0812982404.
- Antifragile: Things That Gain from Disorder. New York: Random House. 2012. ISBN 978-1-4000-6782-4.
- Skin in the Game: Hidden Asymmetries in Daily Life. New York: Random House. 2018. ISBN 978-0-4252-8462-9. (This book was not published with the original bundling of the Incerto series.)

==== Technical Incerto ====
- Statistical Consequences of Fat Tails: Real World Pre-asymptotics, Epistemology, and Applications (Technical Incerto Vol. 1). STEM Academic Press. 2020. ISBN 978-1-5445-0805-4.

==== Other ====
- Dynamic Hedging: Managing Vanilla and Exotic Options. New York: John Wiley & Sons. 1997. ISBN 978-0-471-15280-4.
- Taleb, Nassim Nicholas; Cirillo, Pasquale (2018). The Logic and Statistics of Fat Tails. London: Penguin Books. ISBN 978-0-1419-8836-8.

=== Selected papers ===
- Taleb, N.N., Zalloua, P., Elbassioni, K., Hatzikirou, H., Henschel, A. and Platt, D.E., 2025. Informational rescaling of PCA maps with application to genetic distance. Computational and Structural Biotechnology Journal, 27, pp. 48–56.
- Taleb, N. N., & West, J. (2023). Working with convex responses: Antifragility from finance to oncology. Entropy, 25(2), 343.
- Platt, D. E., Henschel, A., Taleb, N. N., & Zalloua, P. (2024). Anatolian genetic ancestry in North Lebanese populations. Scientific Reports, 14(1), 15518.
- Cirillo, P.; Taleb, N. N. (2020). "Tail risk of contagious diseases". Nature Physics. 16 (6): 606–613. arXiv:2004.08658. Bibcode:2020NatPh..16..606C. doi:10.1038/s41567-020-0921-x. S2CID 215828381.
- Siegenfeld, A. F., Taleb, N. N., & Bar-Yam, Y. (2020). What models can and cannot tell us about COVID-19. Proceedings of the National Academy of Sciences, 117(28), 16092-16095.
- Taleb, N.N.; Norman, J.; Bar-Yam, Y; (26 January 2020) "Systemic Risk of Pandemic via Novel Pathogens – Coronavirus: A Note". Academia.edu. Systemic Risk of Pandemic via Novel Pathogens – Coronavirus: A Note
- Taleb, N. N. (2019). Medicine and Risk Transfer. Foresight: The International Journal of Applied Forecasting, (53), 31-32.
- Taleb, N. N.; Douady, R. (2013). "Mathematical definition, mapping, and detection of (anti)fragility". Quantitative Finance. 13 (11): 1677–1689. arXiv:1208.1189. Bibcode:2013QuFin..13.1677T. doi:10.1080/14697688.2013.800219. S2CID 219716527.
- Taleb, N. N. (2015). "Unique Option Pricing Measure with neither Dynamic Hedging nor Complete Markets". European Financial Management. 21 (2): 228–235. arXiv:1405.2609. doi:10.1111/eufm.12055. S2CID 153841924.
- Geman, D.; Geman, H.; Taleb, N. N. (2015). "Tail Risk Constraints and Maximum Entropy". Entropy. 17 (6): 1–14. arXiv:1412.7647. Bibcode:2015Entrp..17.3724G. doi:10.3390/e17063724. S2CID 2273464.
- Taleb, N. N.; Douady, R. (2015). "On the Super-Additivity and Estimation Biases of Quantile Contributions". Physica A: Statistical Mechanics and its Applications. 429: 252–260. arXiv:1405.1791. Bibcode:2015PhyA..429..252T. doi:10.1016/j.physa.2015.02.038. S2CID 23527680.
- Cirillo, P.; Taleb, N. N. (2016). "On the tail risk of violent conflict and its underestimation". Physica A: Statistical Mechanics and its Applications. 452: 29–45. arXiv:1505.04722. Bibcode:2016PhyA..452...29C. doi:10.1016/j.physa.2016.01.050. S2CID 9716627.
- Taleb, N. N. (2018). "Election predictions as martingales: an arbitrage approach". Quantitative Finance. 452 (1): 1–5. arXiv:1703.06351. doi:10.1080/14697688.2017.1395230. S2CID 158466482.
- Taleb, N. N. (2018). "How much data do you need? An operational, pre-asymptotic metric for fat-tailedness". International Journal of Forecasting. 35 (2): 677–686. arXiv:1802.05495. doi:10.1016/j.ijforecast.2018.10.003. S2CID 139102471.
- Taleb, N. N., & Treverton, G. F. (2015). The Calm Before the Storm: Why Volatility Signals Stability, and Vice Versa. Foreign Aff., 94, 86.

== See also ==
- Applications of randomness
- List of American philosophers
- Taleb distribution
- Dragon King Theory
