= Everett Klipp =

Everett Edward Klipp (October 8, 1926 - January 28, 2011), also known as the "Babe Ruth" of the Chicago Board of Trade (CBOT), was a mentor to Frank Peard, John Horner, Mark Spitznagel and countless other floor traders.

Klipp was born in Manteno, Kankakee County, Illinois. After a hardscrabble childhood and adolescence on a dairy farm, he enlisted in the Navy and served in the Pacific Theater during World War II.

Following the war, Klipp found work as a messenger for a member firm at the CBOT. He advanced rapidly and bought a seat on the CBOT in 1953, eventually founding Alpha Futures, which became a major firm at the exchange. Especially to the traders he trained, Klipp emphasized the importance of knowing how to take a loss, and the necessity of abandoning a losing position before it became a disaster.

== Sources ==
Out of the Pits Traders and Technology from Chicago to London, Univ of Chicago Press, 2006 (paperback 2010)
