= Empirica Capital =

Former American hedge fund

- Type: Hedge fund
- Industry: Investment
- Founded: 1999
- Founder: Nassim Nicholas Taleb
- Defunct: 2005
- Fate: Closed
- Headquarters: Greenwich, Connecticut, United States

Empirica Capital LLC was a hedge fund founded in 1999 by Nassim Nicholas Taleb in partnership with Mark Spitznagel, that used Taleb's black swan strategy. The firm closed in 2005.

The investment strategy of the fund has been explained in a New Yorker article. One of Empirica's funds, Empirica Kurtosis LLC, was reported to have made a 56.86% return in 2000 followed by returns of -8.39% in 2001, -13.81% in 2002, and -3.92% in 2003, according to an investor letter.

Taleb has stated that he shut down Empirica LLC, in 2005 to become a "writer and a scholar". At the time he also "feared he might have a recurrence of throat cancer."

In 2007 Spitznagel founded the firm Universa Investments L.P. with Taleb as an adviser using black swan portfolio hedging strategies similar to Empirica's.
