= The Wheeler Dealers =

1963 film

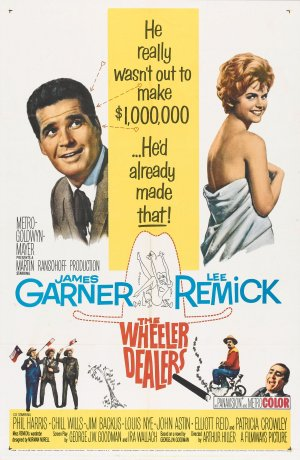
- Theatrical release poster
- Directed by: Arthur Hiller
- Screenplay by: George Goodman; Ira Wallach
- Based on: The Wheeler Dealers; 1959 novel by George Goodman
- Produced by: Martin Ransohoff
- Starring: James Garner; Lee Remick
- Cinematography: Charles Lang
- Edited by: Tom McAdoo
- Music by: Frank De Vol
- Production company: Filmways
- Distributed by: Metro-Goldwyn-Mayer
- Release date: November 14, 1963
- Running time: 107 minutes
- Country: United States
- Language: English
- Box office: $3,200,000 (US/ Canada)

The Wheeler Dealers (a.k.a. Separate Beds in the UK) is a 1963 American romantic comedy film produced by Martin Ransohoff, directed by Arthur Hiller, and starring James Garner and Lee Remick. The script was written by George Goodman and Ira Wallach based on Goodman's 1959 novel of the same name. The film was produced by Filmways and distributed by MGM.

Garner called the film "a broad comedy in which my character is a lot like Bret Maverick." For his performance, he was nominated for the Golden Globe Award for Best Actor – Motion Picture Musical or Comedy.

== Plot ==
Molly Thatcher is a stockbroker languishing in a New York company run by male chauvinist Bullard Bear. When the company does poorly, he decides that he has to fire somebody. As the only female broker, Molly is the obvious choice since dismissing a male broker would make people think the company is in trouble. He assigns her the seemingly impossible task of unloading shares of an obscure company called Universal Widgets, figuring that she will fail, and he will have the excuse he needs to fire her.

Molly meets Henry Tyroon, an aggressive wheeler dealer who dresses, talks, and acts like a stereotypical Texas millionaire. He is interested in her romantically, not Universal Widgets, but decides to help out in order to get closer to her. As they spend time together, Molly watches Henry make complicated business deals, often in partnership with his Texan cronies, Jay Ray, Ray Jay, and J.R. One example is speculative dealing in modern abstract art, with the aid of Stanislas, a cynical avant-garde painter.

Molly and Henry have trouble figuring out Universal Widgets' reason for existence; its only factory burned down long ago. It manufactures nothing and provides no services. (Widgets had something to do with horse-drawn carriages.) It is just a corporation on paper whose sole asset is a huge block of shares in AT&T, bought long, long ago when the stock was ridiculously cheap. Now it pays out hefty, regular dividends to its few complacent shareholders.

When Henry makes attempts to take control of Universal Widgets by what appears to be questionable methods, over-enthusiastic government regulator Hector Vanson takes him to court. Henry, against all advice, orders oil drilling done on the property, and spreads rumors that investment banks are interested in the company, causing the share price to soar. Further complications arise when Jay Ray, Ray Jay, and J.R. get Molly fired so that she will spend more time with Henry. She thinks Henry is responsible for her firing. She also discovers that he is actually an Easterner and a Yale University graduate; masquerading as a Texan just helps him with his wheeling and dealing. The judge dismisses the Federal Securities Commission case when it is determined that all the Universal Widgets shares are in the hands of just a handful of shareholders, not the general public. Henry and the Texas trio's shares are sold back to the original owners, the Whipple family, for a sizable profit. The trio also confess that they were the ones who arranged Molly's dismissal. Upon hearing this, she quickly makes up with Henry, and they kiss. In the end credits, their jet is trailing a "Just Married" sign.

== Cast ==
- James Garner as Henry Tyroon
- Lee Remick as Molly Thatcher
- Phil Harris as Ray Jay Fox
- Chill Wills as Jay Ray Spinelby
- Jim Backus as Bullard Bear
- Louis Nye as Stanislas
- John Astin as Hector Vanson
- Elliott Reid as Leonard Nardo
- Pat Harrington Jr. as Buddy Zack
- Joey Forman as Buster Yarrow
- Patricia Crowley as Eloise Cott
- Charles Watts as J.R. Martin
- Howard McNear as Mr. Wilson
- Don Briggs as Len Flink
- Vaughn Taylor as Thaddeus Whipple
- Robert Strauss as Feinberg, Taxi Driver
- John Marley as Achilles Dimitros
- Peter Leeds as Arthur Watkins

== Reception ==
In a contemporary review for The New York Times, critic Bosley Crowther wrote of the film: "Its gags are so studiously pegged to the business of doing money business that very little monkey business is done. And the business is so complicated–so glib with the percentages and stuff–that anybody but another wheeler dealer might have a hard time keeping up. ... What might be brightly satiric simply isn't because it lacks wit. Too much double entry and too little double entendre".

Dallas Morning News critic John Rosenfield was more positive, calling the film "raucous in its lampoonery" and praising the cast: "Garner and Miss Remick play delightfully. He is as feathery as a Fred MacMurray and of more plausible personal stature. Miss Remick ... is quite pleasantly watchable. This is, we think, her first effort at farce and she's good at it".

== Home media ==
The Wheeler Dealers was released on June 27, 2011 by Warner Home Video as a widescreen Region 1 DVD through its Warner Archive DVD-on-demand service. The film was released on Blu-ray on April 25, 2017.

== See also ==
- List of American films of 1963
