= Skin in the game =

Phrase used by investors

To have "skin in the game" is to have incurred risk (monetary or otherwise) by being involved in achieving a goal.

In the phrase, "skin" refers to an investment (literal or figurative), and "game" is the metaphor for actions on the field of play under discussion. The aphorism is particularly common in business, finance, and gambling, and is also used in politics.

== Etymology ==
The origin of the phrase is uncertain but may have originated from golf skins games played at IBM in the 1980s.

It has commonly been attributed to Warren Buffett, referring to his own investment in his initial fund. However, William Safire disputes that Buffett is the source of the phrase, pointing to earlier instances.

== In business and finance ==
The term is used to ask or convey an owner(s) or principals undefined but significant equity stake in an investment vehicle where outside investors are solicited to invest. The theory is that principal's equity contribution is directly related to the stability of the investment and confidence that management has in the venture and is also (falsely) strongly correlated to the expected yield of the investment.

According to the economist Joseph Stiglitz, there exists a correlation between excessive "skin" and lower returns.

The main issues surrounding "skin" or excess "skin" is the principal–agent problem whereby transparency and fiduciary obligations are disregarded by principals who have capital or excess capital (skin) tied into an entity. Many banks and other financial institutions bar employees from having any "skin" where client capital is managed, principally to address the issue of front running and commingled funds (MF Global). Investment structures such as hedge funds, private equity, Trusts and mutual funds are legally limited to a minority investment positions or are done to create a tax efficient structure. Typically equity inputs by these fiduciaries are around 0.5–2%.

== See also ==
- Eating your own dog food
- Skin in the Game (book)
- Principal–agent problem - The main issues surrounding "skin" or excess "skin"
