= Universa Investments =

American investment firm

Universa Investments L.P.
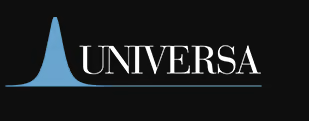
- Company type: Private
- Industry: Investment Management
- Founded: January 2007; 19 years ago
- Founder: Mark Spitznagel
- Headquarters: Miami, Florida, U.S.
- Key people: Mark Spitznagel (President); Nassim Nicholas Taleb (Scientific Advisor)
- Products: Hedge funds Alternative investments
- AUM: US$19.1 billion (June 30, 2022)
- Number of employees: 18 (2022)
- Website: universa.net

Universa Investments ("Universa") is an American investment management firm headquartered in Miami, Florida. It is known as a Black Swan fund that focuses on risk mitigation to protect investors from sharp market downturns.

== Background ==
Universa Investments was founded in January 2007 by Mark Spitznagel with Nassim Nicholas Taleb acting as its advisor. The two of them previously ran Empirica Capital, a hedge fund that closed in 2004 due to subpar returns. Universa was launched with $300 million under management and traded out of a small office in Santa Monica, California. Software programs were developed to search the options markets for deals.

Universa and Empirica followed the Black swan theory which was about unexpected extreme events that have significant impact on the world and the financial markets. The strategy would be to buy out-of-the-money put options at low prices during periods the financial markets are good to protect the firm's position when there is a market downturn. While this strategy did not work with Empirica due to a period of low volatility, it worked well for Universa due to the 2008 financial crisis. Universa purchased put options on the S&P 500 and financial companies such as Goldman Sachs and American International Group which the firm sold for a significant profit after the prices fell. In 2008, Universa had returns over 100% and its assets grew to $6 billion under management in 2009 as more investors approached Universa to provide protection to their investments.

There was speculation that Universa purchasing large amount of puts options on the S&P 500 Index may have been one of the primary causes of the 2010 flash crash.

In September 2011, Universa was stated to be raising $1 billion to start a Macro fund.

On March 1, 2014, Universa moved its headquarters from Santa Monica, California to Miami, Florida to take advantage of the city's business and tax policies.

During the 2015–2016 stock market selloff, Universa had a return on 20% in August 2015 which resulted in a $1 billion gain.

In 2017, CalPERS hired Universa to provide tail risk hedging protection to its investments. In 2020, CalPERS terminated Universa's role citing it had found cheaper and better alternatives.

In 2018, The Wall Street Journal reported that "a strategy consisting of just a 3.3% position in Universa with the rest invested passively in the S&P 500 index had a compound annual return of 12.3% in the 10 years through February (2018), far better than the S&P 500 itself" (and portfolios with "more traditional hedges").

In March 2020, Universa, in a letter to investors, estimated it had a return of 3,612% on invested capital in its strategy due to effects caused by the COVID-19 pandemic.
