= LabEx ReFi - European Laboratory on Financial Regulation =

Labex Refi
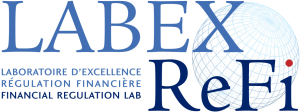

Since the financial crisis, regulation of financial activities is at the center of economic and political events. The crisis has indeed led regulators but also the academic world to ask new questions about the effectiveness of regulation policies. To answer these questions, the French laboratory of excellence on financial regulation (Labex ReFi) was established at the initiative of the Conservatoire national des arts et métiers (CNAM), the Ecole Nationale d'Administration (ENA) and Pantheon-Sorbonne University and ESCP Europe (project leader) in the framework of the “Grand Emprunt”. Financed over 10 years, Labex ReFi will be evaluated by the National Research Agency (ANR).

== Purpose ==
Governance LABEX ReFi is organized around a Scientific Council under the leadership of Prof. Christian de Boissieu, a Strategic Orientation Committee, chaired by Mr. Augustin de Romanet de Beaune, composed of regulators and professionals, as well as academic personalities and an Executive Committee, led by Dr. Raphael Douady and Mr. François-Gilles Le Theule, with representation from each partner institution.

Labex ReFi is a research center dedicated to the evaluation of regulatory policies. It aims both to advance knowledge of the functioning of financial systems and their regulation, and secondly, to "advise" and "guide" the independent action of public authorities in the implementation of policies regulation by providing academic expertise.

Labex ReFi is a multidisciplinary laboratory where specialists in economics, accounting, finance and management, financial mathematics and law, from several institutions, collaborate. All these disciplines are concerned with financial regulation but from different angles, with tools, language, incentives and evaluation systems of their own. One objective of the Labex ReFi is to bring together researchers from various backgrounds to produce this set of "useful" research for the implementation of regulatory policies. This is an important issue because regulation has often been characterized by "silo" logic. Each discipline works separately and develops its own doctrine, without fully understanding questions raised by the interaction with other disciplines, which sometimes leads to erroneous visions and consequently unwelcome decisions or with consequences opposite to the effect sought after.

== Missions ==
Labex ReFi activities articulate around three areas: research, valorization and education.

=== Research projects ===
The research is organized into working groups driven by academic professors or researchers from partner institutions. Labex researchers are interested in major issues of financial regulation, such as asset allocation and evaluation, market (in)efficiency, history of financial crises, interaction with the economy real, financial information, credit rating agencies, banking and insurance regulation, regulating financial activities and capital markets, systemic risk, the valuation of long-term assets, etc. Calls for projects are launched every year since 2012. Doctoral fellowships and postdoctoral contracts are also awarded each year. Partner institutions (University of Paris I, ESCP Europe, CNAM, ENA, ENASS) also animate research seminars dedicated to the regulation.

=== Policy papers valuation ===
Valorization primarily happens through "policy papers", dealing with current regulatory topics and express academic views on these matters. Different types of events are organized, including breakfasts every two months putting together professionals, regulators and academics to discuss various topics. Since November 2011, breakfasts addressed questions related to assessing sovereign debts, the role of rating agencies and the separation of banking activities, market efficiency, the asset quality review, the content of risk reports, etc. Several conferences for large audiences were organized on main regulation themes including a major conference in June 2013 in collaboration with FEBS on "Financial Regulation and Systemic Risk", which brought together over 350 participants, as well as other events, e.g. "Rethinking the finance standards" (October 2011), "Shareholder activism" (January 2012), "4th edition of the European Days of control" (February 2012), "The new prudential standards: what effects banking sector, what effects on financial stability?" (March 2012), etc. Senior researchers from Labex ReFi author a monthly column in Revue Banque on topical subjects. A collective work "How Financial Regulation Can get Europe out of the Crisis" was published in 2014.

=== Development program ===
Labex ReFi is also aimed at developing programs dedicated to financial regulation. A seminar entitled "5 lessons on regulation" organized in collaboration with the Swiss Federal Institute of Technology Zurich (ETH) bring together students from partner institutions in the context of lectures delivered by international lecturers. Other courses are provided involving professionals with extensive practical market or accounting information experience, collectively addressing students from all partner institutions and even from executive education. Ultimately, the aim is to create a "school of regulation" with European scope.

== See also ==
- Bank regulation
- Financial repression
- Global financial system
- Group of Thirty
- Insurance law
- International Centre for Financial Regulation
- International Organization of Securities Commissions
- Regulation of commodity markets
- Regulatory capture
- Securities Commission
