= Spherical cow =

Humorous concept in scientific models

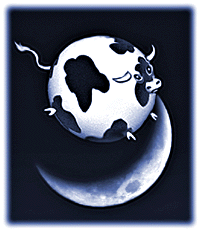
Comic of a spherical cow as illustrated by a 1996 meeting of the American Astronomical Association, in reference to astronomy modeling

The spherical cow is a humorous metaphor for highly simplified scientific models of complex phenomena. Originating in theoretical physics, the metaphor refers to a tendency within some modern fields of science to develop toy models that reduce a problem to the simplest form imaginable, making calculations more feasible, even if the simplification hinders the model's application to reality.

== History ==
The phrase comes from a joke that spoofs the simplifying assumptions sometimes used in theoretical physics.

Milk production at a dairy farm was low, so the farmer wrote to the local university, asking for help from academia. A multidisciplinary team of professors was assembled, headed by a theoretical physicist, and two weeks of intensive on-site investigation took place. The scholars then returned to the university, notebooks crammed with data, where the task of writing the report was left to the team leader. Shortly thereafter the physicist returned to the farm, saying to the farmer, "I have the solution, but it works only in the case of spherical cows in a vacuum."

John Harte, who received his Ph.D. from the University of Wisconsin in 1965, reported that he first heard the joke as a graduate student. One of the earliest published references is in a 1970 article by Arthur O. Williams Jr. of Brown University, who described it as "a professional joke that circulated among scientists a few years ago".

The story is told in many variants, including a joke about a physicist who said he could predict the winner of any race provided it involved spherical horses moving through a vacuum. A 1973 letter to the editor in the journal Science describes the "famous story" about a physicist whose solution to a poultry farm's egg-production problems began with "Postulate a spherical chicken".

== Cultural references ==
A GIF of a homeomorphism from a spherical cow to a normal one

The concept is familiar enough that the phrase is sometimes used as shorthand for the entire issue of proper modeling. For example, Consider a Spherical Cow is a 1985 book about problem solving using simplified models. A 2015 paper on the systemic errors introduced by simplifying assumptions about spherical symmetries in galactic dark-matter haloes was titled "Milking the spherical cow – on aspherical dynamics in spherical coordinates".

References to the joke appear even outside the field of scientific modeling. "Spherical Cow" was chosen as the code name for the Fedora 18 Linux distribution. In the sitcom The Big Bang Theory, a joke is told by Dr. Leonard Hofstadter with the punchline mentioning "spherical chickens in a vacuum", in "The Cooper-Hofstadter Polarization" episode. In the space gravity simulator educational video game Universe Sandbox, a spherical cow was added as a user-placeable object in March 2023.

A 2026 April Fools' Day paper in the American Journal of Physics discusses multipole approximations of the cow's gravitational potential and surface shape, which are useful in analyzing "the spindown of a rotating cow due to the emission of gravitational waves" and the "cow tipping problem" respectively.

== See also ==
- Assume a can opener, a joke about invalid assumptions in economics
- Fermi problem, efforts to produce very broad estimates
- Homo economicus, a hypothetical rational person
- Naïve physics, also called folk physics
- Schwarzschild metric, an exact solution of the Einstein field equations assuming a uniform spherical symmetric nonrotating uncharged mass in a vacuum
