= Joseph Norman =

American artist and educator (born 1957)

Joseph Norman (born March 9, 1957) is an American artist who is currently a professor at the University of Georgia's Lamar Dodd School of Art where he formerly held the title of Chair of the Paintings and Drawings Department.

== Early life and education ==
Norman was born in Chicago in 1957 and is the great grandchild of slaves. Norman discovered his proclivity for art at the age of six or seven; on a trip to the Riverview Amusement Park when friends and family opted for bumper cars and roller coasters, Norman instead spent the whole day sitting and snacking on popcorn while observing the artists make portraits and caricatures. He received his MA from the University of Illinois and MFA from the University of Cincinnati.

== Art career ==
Norman's work has been exhibited internationally in the United States, Costa Rica, and Canada.

His works explore his own lived experiences as a Black man as well as systemic racism and broader issues in Black art. A review in Newport This Week described his artistic practice: "Without pulling punches, Norman, especially in his lithographs, has confronted people with ugly truths about race, social injustice and other issues we are still coming to terms with."

Norman's first solo exhibition was in 1989 at the Museum of the National Center of Afro-American Artists in Boston. In 1995, Norman's show with John Wilson, Dialogue:John Wilson/Joseph Norman opened at the Museum of Fine Arts in Boston. Norman began selling his artwork to the public in 2006 at the request of gallery owner Nancy Hoffman.

As an educator of visual art, Norman has taught at several institutions including the school of the Newport Art Museum, the Rhode Island School of Design, and the University of Georgia, among others. At the University of Georgia, he founded an international study abroad program where students travelled to Latin America, the Galápagos Islands, Ecuador, Costa Rica and Cuba.

== Collections ==
Two of Norman's lithographs are in the collection of the Columbia Museum of Art and other works are in the collections of MoMA, the Smithsonian Museum of American Art, as well as 50 other museum and university collections.
