= Mark Spitznagel =

American investor and hedge fund manager (born 1971)

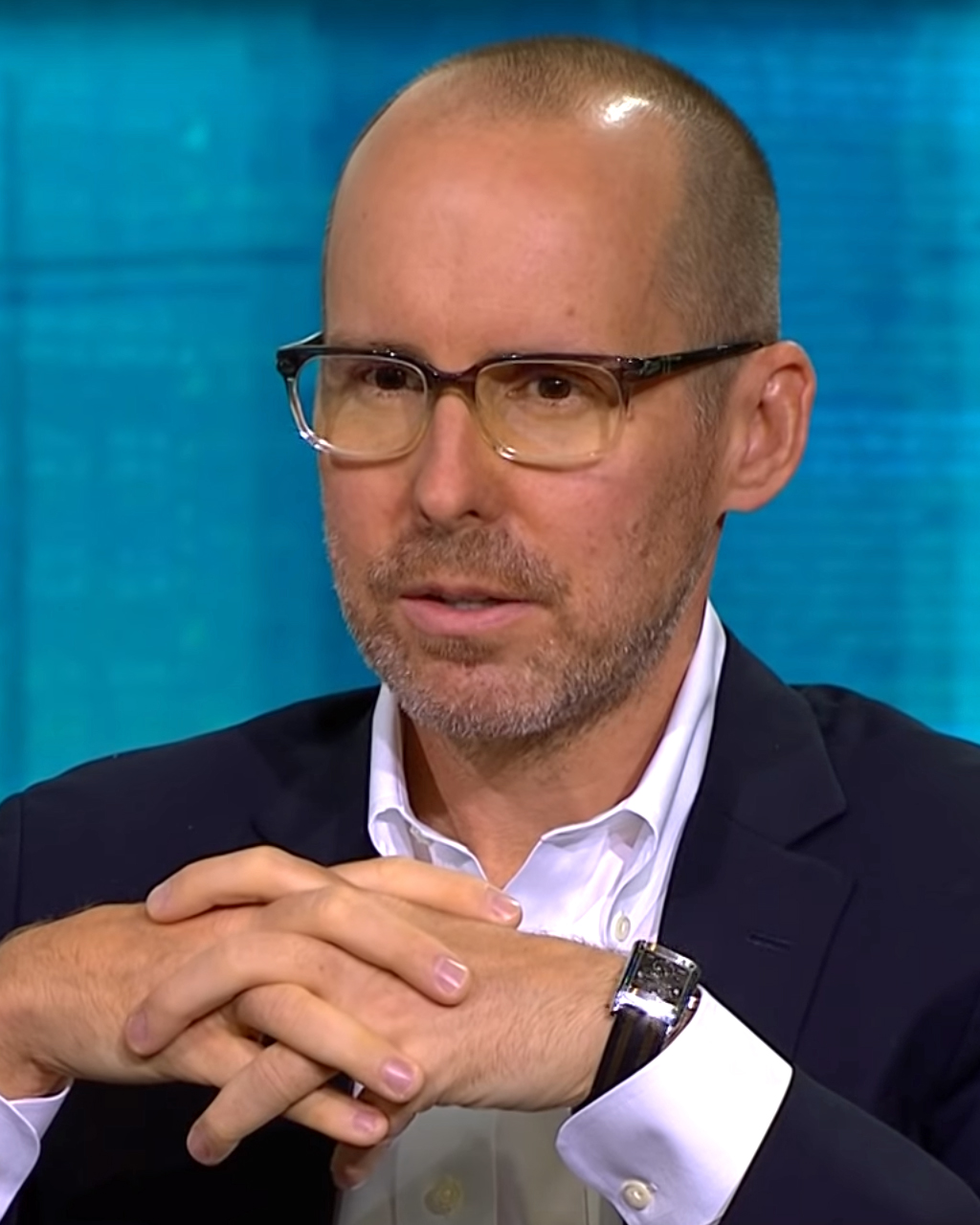
- Born: March 5, 1971 (age 55); Ann Arbor, Michigan, United States
- Education: New York University, Kalamazoo College
- Occupations: Investor, hedge fund manager
- Known for: Founding and managing Universa Investments
- Spouse: Amy Spitznagel

Mark Spitznagel (/ˈspɪtsneɪɡəl/; born March 5, 1971) is an American investor and hedge fund manager. He is the founder, owner, and chief investment officer of Universa Investments, a hedge fund management firm based in Miami, Florida.

He is known as a pioneer in so-called "tail-hedging" or "black swan" investing, an investment strategy intended to provide "insurance-like protection" against stock market crashes.

== Early life and education ==
Spitznagel has a graduate degree in mathematics from the Courant Institute of Mathematical Sciences at New York University and an undergraduate degree from Kalamazoo College.

When he was 16 years old, Spitznagel was apprenticed by 50-year veteran corn and soybean trader Everett Klipp. Spitznagel became an independent pit-trader at the Chicago Board of Trade and later a proprietary trader at Morgan Stanley in New York.

In 1999, Spitznagel and author and financial mathematician Nassim Nicholas Taleb (who was Spitznagel's professor at NYU) established the Empirica Capital "tail-hedging" fund.

== Investment career ==
In 2007, Spitznagel founded the hedge fund Universa Investments, where he is the Chief Investment Officer; Universa offers a type of insurance against extreme market risk. Taleb has been associated with Universa as an advisor for nearly two decades.

In 2018, The Wall Street Journal reported that "a strategy consisting of just a 3.3% position in Universa with the rest invested passively in the S&P 500 had a compound annual return of 12.3% in the 10 years through February (2018), far better than the S&P 500 itself" (and portfolios with "more traditional hedges").

Moreover, "Universa was among a handful of funds that made huge gains" during the 2008 financial crisis.

In 2010, it was alleged that a large trade by Spitznagel in the minutes leading up to the 2010 Flash Crash (when the Dow Jones Industrial Average lost over 9% of its value during the day) was among its primary triggers.

== Investment approach ==
Spitznagel's self-described investment strategy is focused on risk mitigation in portfolio construction, and is intended to allow his clients to take more systematic risk. In general terms, he does this by owning far out-of-the-money put options on stocks. He has called "investing Übermensch" Friedrich Nietzsche's slogan "amor fati"—or the love of one's fate—"the secret to successful investing".

Spitznagel is dismissive of Modern Portfolio Theory, and specifically its emphasis on correlations and mean-variance (or Sharpe ratios), and skeptic of market forecasts, although, according to a New York Times article, he predicted two market routs in the 2000s, first in 2000 and then in 2008, as well as the "2000s commodities boom".

He has described what he does as lowering what he calls the "volatility tax" paid by investors—"the hidden tax on an investment portfolio caused by the negative compounding of large investment losses." He detailed in an investor letter how "mathematically, it is the rare big loss, not the frequent small losses, that matters most to long-run compounding," and called the Swiss mathematician and physicist Daniel Bernoulli "Universa's Patron Saint".

Spitznagel wrote a book in 2013 titled The Dao of Capital: Austrian Investing in a Distorted World about the Austrian School of economics and its ostensible application to investing. Paul Tudor Jones said of Spitznagel's book that it "shows how a seemingly difficult immediate loss becomes an advantageous intermediate step for greater future gain, and thus why we must become 'patient now and strategically impatient later'."

== Political and economic views ==
As a libertarian and advocate of Austrian economics, Spitznagel has been very critical of central bank monetary interventionism. For instance, he has written pieces on Ludwig von Mises and about the Fed's alleged culpability for "increasing wealth disparity", which focused on the economic distortions that ostensibly result from money creation.

In his book and in a 2015 op-ed, Spitznagel connected every similar high point in the Tobin's Q-ratio since 1900 with past monetary interventionism and subsequent stock market losses, which he called "perfectly predictable, by economic logic alone."

Along with entrepreneur Peter Thiel, Spitznagel was a major supporter of the 2012 Republican presidential campaign of U.S. Congressman Ron Paul, a friend and fellow libertarian who "shares [Spitznagel's] contempt for the Federal Reserve" and his desire for a non-interventionist foreign policy. Spitznagel was also senior economic advisor to the 2016 Republican presidential campaign of Ron's son, U.S. Senator Rand Paul.

Spitznagel has not been optimistic about the tariffs President Trump has instituted, calling the plunge in April 2025, "a trap."

== Personal life ==
Spitznagel is among the many financial executives and hedge fund managers who moved their residence and operations to Florida. In 2014, he moved his hedge fund offices from Los Angeles to Miami, citing Florida's "more hospitable business and tax environment" than California's. There is no income tax or estate tax in the state of Florida.

According to The Wall Street Journal, Spitznagel splits his time between his Miami office and Michigan, where his family lives.

He and his wife built, own, and operate Idyll Farms, a farm in Michigan that pastures dairy goats and produces artisanal chèvre. A Bloomberg article claimed that the farm is making "some of the best goat cheese in America".

Spitznagel also reportedly flies planes and practices ashtanga yoga.

== See also ==
- Black Swan fund
