= Assume a can opener =

Mocking catchphrase

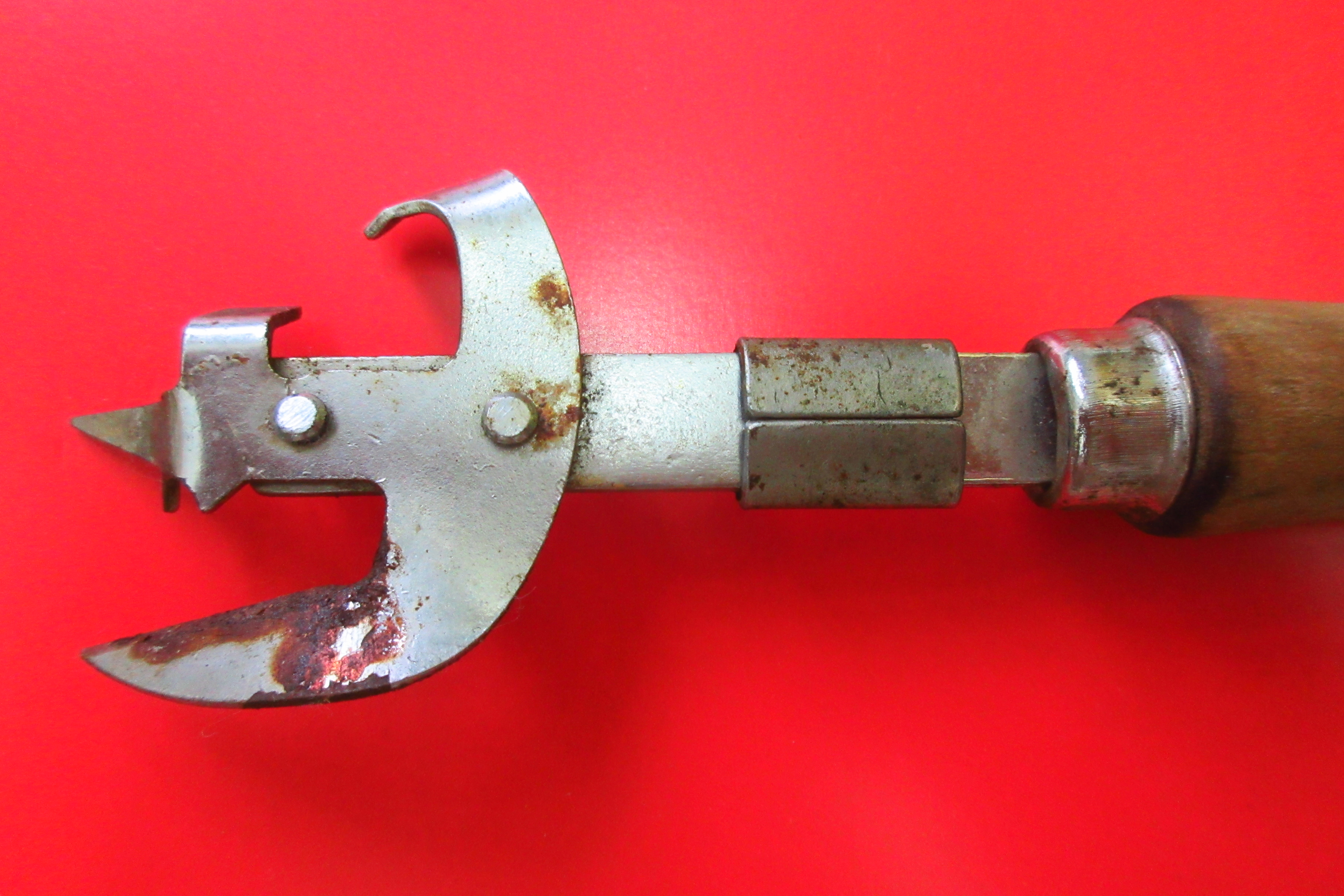
A manual can opener

"Assume a can opener" is a catchphrase used to mock economists and other theorists who base their conclusions on unjustified or oversimplified assumptions.

The phrase derives from a desert island joke which dates to at least 1970 and possibly originated with British economists. The first book mentioning it is likely Economics as a Science (1970) by Kenneth E. Boulding:

There is a story that has been going around about a physicist, a chemist, and an economist who were stranded on a desert island with no implements and a can of food. The physicist and the chemist each devised an ingenious mechanism for getting the can open; the economist merely said, "Assume we have a can opener"!

The phrase was popularized in a 1981 book and has become sufficiently well known that many writers on economic topics use it as a catchphrase without further explanation.

== Examples of usage ==
The joke and its application to economists were taken up in the 1981 book Paper Money by George Goodman (under the pseudonym "Adam Smith"), wherein he applied the story to the then-tendency of economists to assume that inflation would go away, and mocked the notion that economists are "the high priests of this esoteric mystery." In contrast, he asks "why the economists are always wrong." The phrase "assume a can opener" became "his nagging accusation against the deductive logic and analytical models of economists."

US President Ronald Reagan told the joke to students and faculty at Purdue University on April 9, 1987.

Italian finance minister Tommaso Padoa-Schioppa used the phrase in 2006 to illustrate that "Very often, when economists comment, they assume politics away." It has been used in Australia to describe "a treasurer who has lost all touch with reality" and politicians "assuming away" the problem of getting a global greenhouse gas deal. It was used in India to describe American economic policy toward China.

== See also ==
- Existence theorem – Theorem which asserts the existence of an object
- Occam's razor – Philosophical problem-solving principle
- Spherical cow – Humorous concept in scientific models
- Thought experiment – Hypothetical situation
