= The Phonies =

Finnish rock band

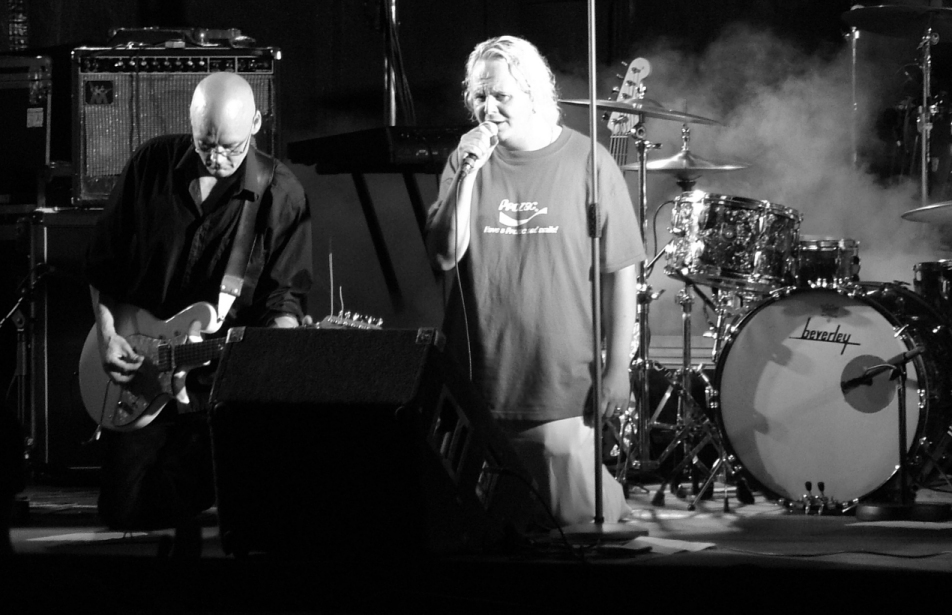
- Risto Lehtomaa and Tom Stenman of the Phonies in Aug, 2004

Background information
- Origin: Ykspihlaja], Kokkola, Finland
- Genres: Alternative rock, Indie rock, Psychedelic rock
- Years active: 2002 to present
- Labels: Motley, Money Laundry Records, Double D Records
- Members: Tom Stenman, Risto Lehtomaa, Joni Tiala, Pekka Hietalahti and Ville Keiski
- Past members: Tommi Lahtonen; Jukka Kääntä; Masi Isohanni; Jari-Pekka Kola
- Website: http://www.thephonies.net

The Phonies are a Finnish rock band formed in Ykspihlaja, Kokkola in 2002. The band's members are vocalist Tom Stenman, guitarist Risto Lehtomaa, and bassist Pekka Hietalahti. The Phonies is coupled around the songwriting partnership of Tom Stenman and Risto Lehtomaa, who have been working together since the late 1980s. In addition to The Phonies, Stenman and Lehtomaa are known from the late Finnish guitar pop band called The Refreshments, which released a few singles and one album during the 1990s. Indie critics highly acclaimed The Refreshments attracted international attention and they made mini tour with UK indie band Mega City Four. The Refreshments broke up during the recording sessions of their second album. After a few years of musical separation this characteristic songwriter duo reunited in the form of The Phonies. The band developed a more organic musical style as they drifted away from the sound of power pop, helping to develop the characteristic rock sound which drew its strength from the 70's psychedelia and musical influences such as The Bevis Frond, Roky Erickson and Kevin Ayers. Stenman's lyrics are known for being whimsical and somewhat cryptic. Stenman's soul-searching and intense vocals combined to Lehtomaa's sense of style and melody forms the core of The Phonies music.

== Members ==
Present
- Tom Stenman (lead vocals)
- Risto Lehtomaa (guitar)
- Joni Tiala (guitar)
- Pekka Hietalahti (bass)
- Ville Keiski (drums)
Former members
- Tommi Lahtonen (drums)
- Jukka Kääntä (guitar & backing vocals)
- Jari-Pekka Kola (guitar)
- Masi Isohanni (keyboards & organ)

== Discography ==
=== Albums ===
Title	Label	Date of Release
Instant Elation	Motley	Nov 2004
Gran Tourettes	Money Laundry	Jun 2006

=== Singles ===
Title	Label	Date of Release
Gospel	Money Laundry	Mar 2006
The Phonies II	Money Laundry	Feb 2003
The Phonies I	Money Laundry	May 2002

=== Compilations & Live Recordings ===
- Drug Buddies: A Tribute To The Lemonheads (Double D Records, 2006)
- The Power Pop Overthrow vol. 1 (272 Records, 2007)
