= George Goodman =

American author, broadcaster (1930–2014)

- Born: George Jerome Waldo Goodman; August 10, 1930; St. Louis, Missouri, U.S.
- Died: January 3, 2014 (aged 83); Miami, Florida, U.S.
- Other name: Adam Smith
- Education: Harvard University (BA); Brasenose College, Oxford (BLitt)
- Spouse: Sally Brophy (m. 1961; died 2007)
- Children: 2

George Jerome Waldo Goodman (August 10, 1930 – January 3, 2014) was an American author and economics broadcast commentator, best known by his pseudonym Adam Smith (which was assigned by Clay Felker at New York magazine in order to keep his published articles about Wall Street anonymous). He published fiction under his own name.

== Background, education, and career ==
Goodman was born in St. Louis, Missouri, the son of Alexander Mark Goodman and Viona Cremer Goodman. He attended Harvard College, graduating magna cum laude, and served as an editor of The Harvard Crimson. Goodman won a Rhodes Scholarship to Brasenose College, Oxford, where he read for the B. Litt. His first novel, The Bubble Makers, published simultaneously in the UK and the United States, was written during this period.

In 1954, before the Special Forces became the Green Berets, he joined the US Army Special Forces in the Intelligence group known as Psywar (psychological warfare). In 1961, Goodman married American actress Sally Brophy, with whom he had two children. She died in 2007.

His personal style of presenting economic facts and data has been described as that of "a witty, urbane dinner guest, a droll observer of human affairs", rather than a stodgy economist. Goodman pioneered a style of financial writing that made the language and concepts of Wall Street more understandable and accessible to the typical investor.

Goodman's first non-fiction book, The Money Game (1968), was a number one bestseller for over a year and earned him the 1969 Gerald Loeb Special Book Award. In Paper Money (1981), he memorably introduced the catchphrase "Assume a can opener" to mock the tendency of economists to make unjustified assumptions and asked "Why are the economists almost always wrong?" During a stint in Hollywood, he wrote screen plays, including that for The Wheeler Dealers, starring James Garner and Lee Remick, adapted from his novel of the same title.

He was a member of the Editorial Board of The New York Times, an editor of Esquire Magazine, a writer for Fortune magazine, and a founding member of New York magazine where he worked with such writers as Tom Wolfe, Jimmy Breslin, and Gloria Steinem.

In 1984, Goodman came to television as the creator, anchor and editor-in-chief of Adam Smith's Money World. Running on the Public Broadcasting Service in the US, it became the most honored program in its field, winning eight Emmy nominations and five Emmy Awards, as well as the Overseas Press Club Award. The documentary specials won gold medals at the Houston International Film Festival and the Flagstaff Film Festival. The show used cartoon characters and reports from the field to explain and simplify complex financial subjects to its audience. Airing in over forty countries, it was also the first American business news show broadcast in the Soviet Union, airing weekly with a Russian soundtrack.

In 1998 Goodman was elected as a fellow of the National Academy of Public Administration.

Beginning in 1998 Goodman traveled the globe each year making television specials on countries and regions with fast-growing or emerging economies such as China, Russia, the Pacific Rim, Latin America, India, and Israel. Goodman has also conducted interviews with leaders in both the fields of business and politics—ranging from Warren Buffett to Mikhail Gorbachev.

Beginning March 10, 2008, Goodman appeared along with two other personal finance advisers in the "Dollars and Sense" television advertising campaign for the Hyundai Motor Company.

== Death ==
Goodman's son Mark announced his father died at the age of 83 on January 3, 2014, at the University of Miami Hospital after a long battle with the bone marrow disorder myelofibrosis.

== Works ==
Fiction

- The Bubble Makers (1955)
- A Time for Paris (1957)
- The Wheeler Dealers (1963)

Children's fiction

- Bascombe: The Fastest Hound Alive

Nonfiction

- The Money Game (1968)
- Supermoney (1972)
- Powers of Mind (1975)
- Paper Money (1981)
- The Roaring '80s (1988)

== See also ==
- Political economy
- List of economists
