= Antifragility =

System property

Antifragility is a property of systems in which they increase in capability to thrive as a result of stressors, shocks, volatility, noise, mistakes, faults, attacks, or failures. The concept was coined by Nassim Nicholas Taleb in his book, Antifragile, and in technical papers. In his book, Taleb helps readers understand antifragility is fundamentally different from the concepts of resiliency (i.e. the ability to recover from failure) and robustness (that is, the ability to withstand failure). The concept has been applied in risk analysis, physics, molecular biology, transportation planning, engineering, aerospace (NASA), and computer science. It can also be applied to targeted introspection.

Taleb defines it as follows in a letter to Nature responding to an earlier review of his book in that journal:

Simply, antifragility is defined as a convex response to a stressor or source of harm (for some range of variation), leading to a positive sensitivity to increase in volatility (or variability, stress, dispersion of outcomes, or uncertainty, what is grouped under the designation "disorder cluster"). Likewise fragility is defined as a concave sensitivity to stressors, leading to a negative sensitivity to increase in volatility. The relation between fragility, convexity, and sensitivity to disorder is mathematical, obtained by theorem, not derived from empirical data mining or some historical narrative. It is a priori.

— Taleb, N. N., Philosophy: 'Antifragility' as a mathematical idea. Nature, 2013 Feb 28; 494(7438), 430-430

In different words, antifragility can be conceptualized as the specific trait of something to, after receiving negative feedback or stress creating tension, recover with additional response mechanisms or enforced ones to the same stimuli.

== Antifragile versus robust/resilient ==
In his book, Taleb stresses the differences between antifragile and robust/resilient. "Antifragility is beyond resilience or robustness. The resilient resists shocks and stays the same; the antifragile gets better." The concept has now been applied to ecosystems in a rigorous way. In their work, the authors review the concept of ecosystem resilience in its relation to ecosystem integrity from an information theory approach. This work reformulates and builds upon the concept of resilience in a way that is mathematically conveyed and can be heuristically evaluated in real-world applications: for example, ecosystem antifragility. The authors also propose that for socio-ecosystem governance, planning or in general, any decision making perspective, antifragility might be a valuable and more desirable goal to achieve than a resilience aspiration. In the same way, Pineda and co-workers have proposed a simply calculable measure of antifragility, based on the change of "satisfaction" (i.e., network complexity) before and after adding perturbations, and apply it to random Boolean networks (RBNs). They also show that several well known biological networks such as Arabidopsis thaliana cell-cycle are as expected antifragile. You can understand from a physical perspective on why ecosystems are antifragile. To zoom into a specific example, in the same way over long periods of time species adapt to new/changed environments, and skin calluses in response to repeated stimuli, ecosystems and their components adapt.

== Antifragile versus adaptive/cognitive ==
An adaptive system is one that changes its behavior based on information available at time of utilization (as opposed to having the behavior defined during system design). This characteristic is sometimes referred to as cognitive. While adaptive systems allow for robustness under a variety of scenarios (often unknown during system design), they are not necessarily antifragile. In other words, the difference between adaptive and antifragile is the difference between a system that is robust under volatile environments/conditions, and one that is robust in a previously unknown environment. Adaptiveness is the ability to mold into new environments, while in contrast antifragility is the specific response to new, typically negatively impactful, stimuli.

== Mathematical heuristic ==
Taleb proposed a simple heuristic for detecting fragility. If $f(a)$ is some model of $a$, then fragility exists when $H<0$, robustness exists when $H=0$, and antifragility exists when $H>0$, where

$H = \frac{f(a-\Delta)+f(a+\Delta)}{2}-f(a)$.

In short, the heuristic is to adjust a model input higher and lower. If the average outcome of the model after the adjustments is significantly worse than the model baseline, then the model is fragile with respect to that input.

== Applications ==
The concept has been applied in business and management, physics, psychology, risk analysis, molecular biology, transportation planning, urban planning, engineering, aerospace (NASA), computer science, water system design, and cancer.

In computer science, there is a structured proposal for an "Antifragile Software Manifesto", to react to traditional system designs. The major idea is to develop antifragility by design, building a system which improves from environment's input.

== See also ==
- Complexity theory and organizations
- Hygiene hypothesis
- Information management
- Structures of organizations
  - Nodal organizational structure
- Systems theory
  - Systems engineering
  - System accident
