= Extreme value (disambiguation) =

Extreme values are the maximum and minimum values of a function or set.

The term may also refer to:

- Extreme value theorem, a concept in calculus
- Extreme value theory, a concept in statistics
- Extreme value distribution, a statistical distribution

== See also ==
- Extreme points
