= James Pickands =

American mathematical statistician (1931–2022)

James Pickands III (September 4, 1931 – March 9, 2022) was an American mathematical statistician known for his contribution to extreme value theory and stochastic processes.

Pickands was born in Euclid, Ohio to James Pickands II and Sarah Cornelia Martin. He studied at Yale University, where he obtained his bachelor's degree. He then moved to Columbia University, where he received his PhD under Simeon Berman in 1965. While at Columbia, Pickands also worked with Emil Gumbel, and developed interests in extreme value theory.

Pickands served in the US Army in Aberdeen, Maryland after graduating from Columbia university. He briefly taught at Virginia Tech as an assistant professor before joining the Wharton School at the University of Pennsylvania in 1969 as an associate professor, where he stayed for the rest of his career.

Pickands had three doctoral students, including Bruce Cooil.

== Personal life ==
Pickands's great-grandfather James S. Pickands (1839–1896) is a cofounder of the American shipping company Pickands Mather Group.

== Bibliography ==
- Pickands Iii, James (1967). "Sample Sequences of Maxima". The Annals of Mathematical Statistics. 38 (5): 1570–1574. doi:10.1214/aoms/1177698711. ISSN 0003-4851.
- Pickands, James (1967). "Maxima of stationary Gaussian processes". Zeitschrift für Wahrscheinlichkeitstheorie und Verwandte Gebiete. 7 (3): 190–223. doi:10.1007/BF00532637. ISSN 0044-3719. S2CID 125732567.
- Pickands Iii, James (1968). "Moment Convergence of Sample Extremes". The Annals of Mathematical Statistics. 39 (3): 881–889. doi:10.1214/aoms/1177698320. ISSN 0003-4851.
- Pickands, James (1969). "Upcrossing probabilities for stationary Gaussian processes". Transactions of the American Mathematical Society. 145: 51–73. doi:10.1090/S0002-9947-1969-0250367-X. ISSN 0002-9947.
- Pickands, James (1971). "The two-dimensional Poisson process and extremal processes". Journal of Applied Probability. 8 (4): 745–756. doi:10.2307/3212238. ISSN 0021-9002. JSTOR 3212238. S2CID 208869161.
- Pickands Iii, James (1975). "Statistical Inference Using Extreme Order Statistics". The Annals of Statistics. 3 (1). doi:10.1214/aos/1176343003. ISSN 0090-5364.
- Pickands, James (1981). "Multivariate extreme value distribution." Proceedings 43th, Session of International Statistical Institution, 859–878.
- Pickands Iii, James (1986). "The Continuous and Differentiable Domains of Attraction of the Extreme Value Distributions". The Annals of Probability. 14 (3). doi:10.1214/aop/1176992453. ISSN 0091-1798.

== See also ==
- Pickands–Balkema–De Haan theorem
