= Fisher–Tippett–Gnedenko theorem =

Theorem in statistics

In mathematical statistics, the Fisher–Tippett–Gnedenko theorem (also the Fisher–Tippett theorem or the extreme value theorem) is a general result in extreme value theory regarding asymptotic distribution of extreme order statistics. The maximum of a sample of iid random variables after proper renormalization can only converge in distribution to one of three possible distribution families: the Gumbel distribution, the Fréchet distribution, or the Weibull distribution. Credit for the extreme value theorem and its convergence details are given to Fréchet (1927), Fisher and Tippett (1928), von Mises (1936), and Gnedenko (1943).

The role of the extremal types theorem for maxima is similar to that of central limit theorem for averages, except that the central limit theorem applies to the average of a sample from any distribution with finite variance, while the Fisher–Tippet–Gnedenko theorem only states that if the distribution of a normalized maximum converges, then the limit has to be one of a particular class of distributions. It does not state that the distribution of the normalized maximum does converge.

A formal statement can be found in the Chapman & Hall/CRC Handbook of Statistics of Extremes.

== Statement ==
Let $X_1, X_2, \ldots, X_n$ be an n-sized sample of independent and identically-distributed random variables, each of whose cumulative distribution function is $F$. Suppose that there exist two sequences of real numbers $a_n > 0$ and $b_n \in \mathbb{R}$ such that the following limits converge to a non-degenerate distribution function:

$$\lim_{n \to \infty} \mathbb{P}\left( \frac{\max\{X_1, \dots, X_n\} - b_n}{ a_n } \leq x \right) = G(x) ,$$

or equivalently:

$$\lim_{n \to \infty}\bigl(F(a_n x + b_n)\bigr)^n = G(x) .$$

In such circumstances, the limiting function $G$ is the cumulative distribution function of a distribution belonging to either the Gumbel, the Fréchet, or the Weibull distribution family.

In other words, if the limit above converges, then up to a linear change of coordinates $G(x)$ will assume either the form:

$$G_\gamma(x) = \exp\big( \!-( 1 + \gamma x )^{-1 / \gamma }\big) \quad \text{for } \gamma \ne 0 ,$$

with the non-zero parameter $\gamma$ also satisfying $1 + \gamma x > 0$ for every $x$ value supported by $F$ (for all values $x$ for which $F(x) \ne 0$). Otherwise it has the form:

$$G_0(x) = \exp\bigl(\!-\exp(-x)\bigr) \quad \text{for } \gamma = 0 .$$

This is the cumulative distribution function of the generalized extreme value distribution (GEV) with extreme value index $\gamma$. The GEV distribution groups the Gumbel, Fréchet, and Weibull distributions into a single composite form.

== Conditions of convergence ==
The Fisher–Tippett–Gnedenko theorem is a statement about the convergence of the limiting distribution $G(x)$, above. The study of conditions for convergence of $G$ to particular cases of the generalized extreme value distribution began with Mises (1936) and was further developed by Gnedenko (1943).

Let $F$ be the distribution function of $X$, and $X_1, \dots, X_n$ be some i.i.d. sample thereof. Also let $x_\mathsf{max}$ be the population maximum: $x_\mathsf{max} \equiv \sup \{x \mid F(x) < 1\}$.

Then the limiting distribution of the normalized sample maximum, given by $G$ above, will then be one of the following three types:

- Fréchet distribution ($\gamma > 0$): For strictly positive $\gamma > 0$, the limiting distribution converges if and only if $x_\mathsf{max} = \infty$ and

$\lim_{t \rightarrow \infty} \frac{1 - F(ut)}{ 1 - F(t) } = u^{-1/\gamma }\$ for all $u > 0$.

In this case, possible sequences that will satisfy the theorem conditions are $b_n = 0$ and $a_n = F^{-1} \! \left( 1-\tfrac{1}{n} \right)$. Strictly positive $\gamma$ corresponds to what is called a heavy tailed distribution.

- Gumbel distribution ($\gamma = 0$): For trivial $\gamma = 0$, and with $x_\mathsf{max}$ either finite or infinite, the limiting distribution converges if and only if

$\lim_{t \rightarrow x_\mathsf{max} } \frac{ 1 - F(t + u \, \tilde{g}(t)) }{ 1 - F(t) } = \mathrm{e}^{-u}$ for all $u > 0$ with $\tilde{g}(t) \equiv \frac{\int_{t}^{ x_\mathsf{max} }\bigl(1 - F(s)\bigr)\, \mathrm{d}s }{ 1 - F(t) }$.

Possible sequences here are $b_n = F^{-1} \left(\ 1 - \tfrac{1}{n}\right)$ and $a_n = \tilde{g}\bigl( F^{-1} \! \left(1 - \tfrac{1}{n}\right)\bigr)$.

- Weibull distribution ($\gamma < 0$): For strictly negative $\gamma < 0$, the limiting distribution converges if and only if $x_\mathsf{max} < \infty$ (is finite) and

$\lim_{t \rightarrow 0^+} \frac{ 1 - F(x_\mathsf{max} - ut)}{ 1 - F(x_\mathsf{max} - t) } = u^{-1/\gamma}$ for all $u > 0$.

Note that for this case the exponential term $-1/\gamma$ is strictly positive, since $\gamma$ is strictly negative.
Possible sequences here are $b_n = x_\mathsf{max}$ and $a_n = x_\mathsf{max} - F^{-1} \! \left( 1 - \tfrac{1}{n}\right)$.

Note that the second formula (the Gumbel distribution) is the limit of the first (the Fréchet distribution) as $\gamma$ goes to zero.

== Examples ==
=== Fréchet distribution ===
The Cauchy distribution's density function is:

$$f(x) = \frac{ 1 }{\ \pi(1 + x^2) \ }\ ,$$

and its cumulative distribution function is:

$$F(x) = \frac{\ 1\ }{ 2 } + \frac{1}{\ \pi\ } \arctan\left( \frac{ x }{\ \pi\ } \right) ~.$$

A little bit of calculus show that the right tail's cumulative distribution $\ 1 - F(x)\$ is asymptotic to $\ \frac{ 1 }{\ x\ }\ ,$ or

$\ln F(x) \rightarrow \frac{-1~}{\ x\ } \quad \mathsf{~ as ~} \quad x \rightarrow \infty \ ,$

so we have

$$\ln \left(\ F(x)^n\ \right) = n\ \ln F(x) \sim \frac{ -n~~ }{ x } ~.$$

Thus we have

$$F(x)^n \approx \exp \left( \frac{ -n~~ }{ x } \right)$$

and letting $\ u \equiv \frac{ x }{\ n\ } - 1\$ (and skipping some explanation)

$$\lim_{n \to \infty}\Bigl(\ F\bigl(\ n\ (u + 1)\ \bigr)^n\ \Bigr) = \exp\left( \tfrac{-1~}{\ 1 + u \ } \right) = G_1(u)\$$

for any $\ u ~.$

=== Gumbel distribution ===
Let us take the normal distribution with cumulative distribution function

$$F(x) = \frac{1}{2} \operatorname{erfc}\left( \frac{-x~}{\ \sqrt{2\ }\ } \right) ~.$$

We have

$\ln F(x)\ \rightarrow\ - \frac{\ \exp\left( -\tfrac{1}{2} x^2 \right)\ }{ \sqrt{2\pi\ }\ x } \qquad \mathsf{~ as ~} \qquad x\ \rightarrow\ \infty$

and thus

$\ln \left(\ F(x)^n\ \right) = n \ln F(x)\ \rightarrow\ -\frac{\ n \exp\left( -\tfrac{1}{2} x^2 \right)\ }{ \sqrt{2 \pi\ }\ x } \qquad \mathsf{~ as ~} \qquad x\ \rightarrow\ \infty ~.$

Hence we have

$$F(x)^n \approx \exp \left( -\ \frac{\ n\ \exp\left( -\tfrac{1}{2} x^2 \right)\ }{\ \sqrt{2\pi\ }\ x\ } \right) ~.$$

If we define $\ c_n\$ as the value that exactly satisfies

$$\frac{\ n \exp\left( -\ \tfrac{1}{2} c_n^2 \right)\ }{\ \sqrt{2\pi\ }\ c_n\ } = 1\ ,$$

then for $\ x \approx c_n\ ,$ we find that

$$\frac{\ n\ \exp \left( -\ \tfrac{1}{2} x^2 \right)\ }{ \sqrt{2\pi\ }\ x } \approx \exp\left(\ c_n\ ( c_n - x )\ \right) ~.$$

As $\ n\$ increases, this becomes a good approximation for a wider and wider range of $\ c_n\ ( c_n - x )\$ so letting $\ u \equiv c_n\ ( x - c_n)\$ we find that

$$\lim_{n \to \infty}\biggl(\ F\left( \tfrac{u}{~ c_n\ } + c_n \right)^n\ \biggr) = \exp\! \Bigl( -\exp(-u) \Bigr) = G_0(u) ~.$$

Equivalently,

$$\lim_{n \to \infty} \mathbb{P}\ \Biggl( \frac{\ \max \{ X_1,\ \ldots,\ X_n \} - c_n\ }{ \left( \frac{1}{~ c_n\ } \right) } \leq u \Biggr) = \exp\! \Bigl( -\exp(-u) \Bigr) = G_0(u) ~.$$

With this result, we see retrospectively that we need $\ \ln c_n \approx \frac{\ \ln\ln n\ }{ 2 }\$ and then

$$c_n \approx \sqrt{ 2\ln n\ }\ ,$$

so the maximum is expected to climb toward infinity ever more slowly.

=== Weibull distribution ===
We may take the simplest example, a uniform distribution between 0 and 1, with cumulative distribution function

$F(x) = x\$ for any x value from 0 to 1 .

For values of $\ x\ \rightarrow\ 1\$ we have

$\ln\Bigl(\ F(x)^n\ \Bigr) = n\ \ln F(x)\ \rightarrow\ n\ (\ 1 - x\ ) ~.$

So for $\ x \approx 1\$ we have

$$\ F(x)^n \approx \exp(\ n - n\ x\ ) ~.$$

Let $\ u \equiv 1 + n\ (\ 1 - x\ )\$ and get

$$\lim_{n \to \infty} \Bigl(\ F\! \left( \tfrac{\ u\ }{n} + 1 - \tfrac{\ 1\ }{ n } \right)\ \Bigr)^n = \exp\! \bigl(\ -(1 - u)\ \bigr) = G_{-1}(u) ~.$$

Close examination of that limit shows that the expected maximum approaches 1 in inverse proportion to n .

== See also ==
- Extreme value theory
- Gumbel distribution
- Generalized extreme value distribution
- Generalized Pareto distribution
- Pickands–Balkema–de Haan theorem
