= Catastrophic failure =

Sudden and total failure from which recovery is impossible

A catastrophic failure is a sudden and total failure from which recovery is impossible. Catastrophic failures often lead to cascading systems failure. The term is most commonly used for structural failures, but has often been extended to many other disciplines in which total and irrecoverable loss occurs, such as a head crash occurrence on a hard disk drive.

For example, catastrophic failure can be observed in steam turbine rotor failure, which can occur due to peak stress on the rotor; stress concentration increases up to a point at which it is excessive, leading ultimately to the failure of the disc.

In firearms, catastrophic failure usually refers to a rupture or disintegration of the barrel or receiver of the gun when firing it. Some possible causes of this are an out-of-battery gun, an inadequate headspace, the use of incorrect ammunition, the use of ammunition with an incorrect propellant charge, a partially or fully obstructed barrel, or weakened metal in the barrel or receiver. A failure of this type, known colloquially as a "kaboom", or "kB" failure, can pose a threat not only to the user(s) but even many bystanders.

In chemical engineering, a reaction which undergoes thermal runaway can cause catastrophic failure.

It can be difficult to isolate the cause or causes of a catastrophic failure from other damage that occurred during the failure. Forensic engineering and failure analysis deal with finding and analysing these causes.

== Examples ==
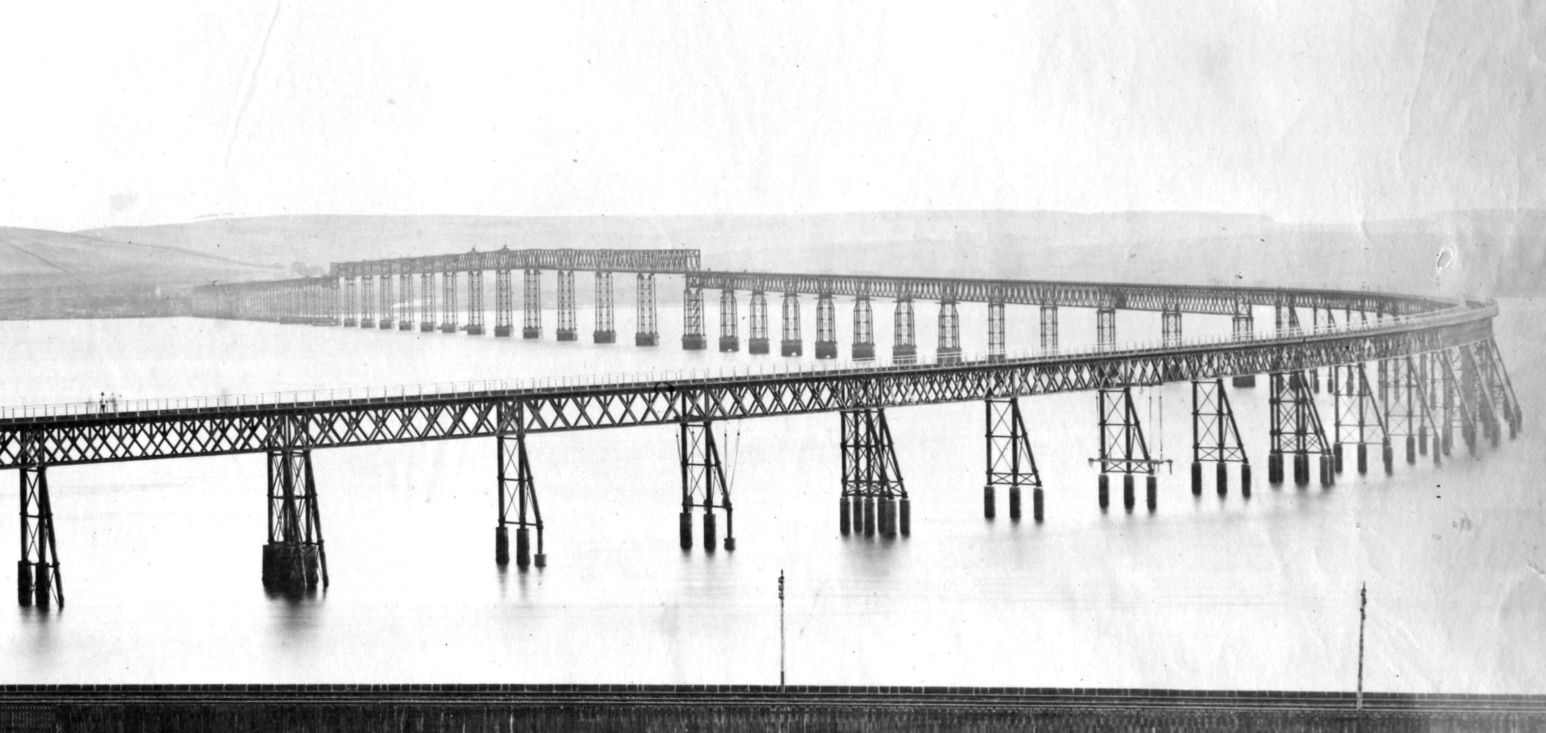
Original Tay Bridge from the north

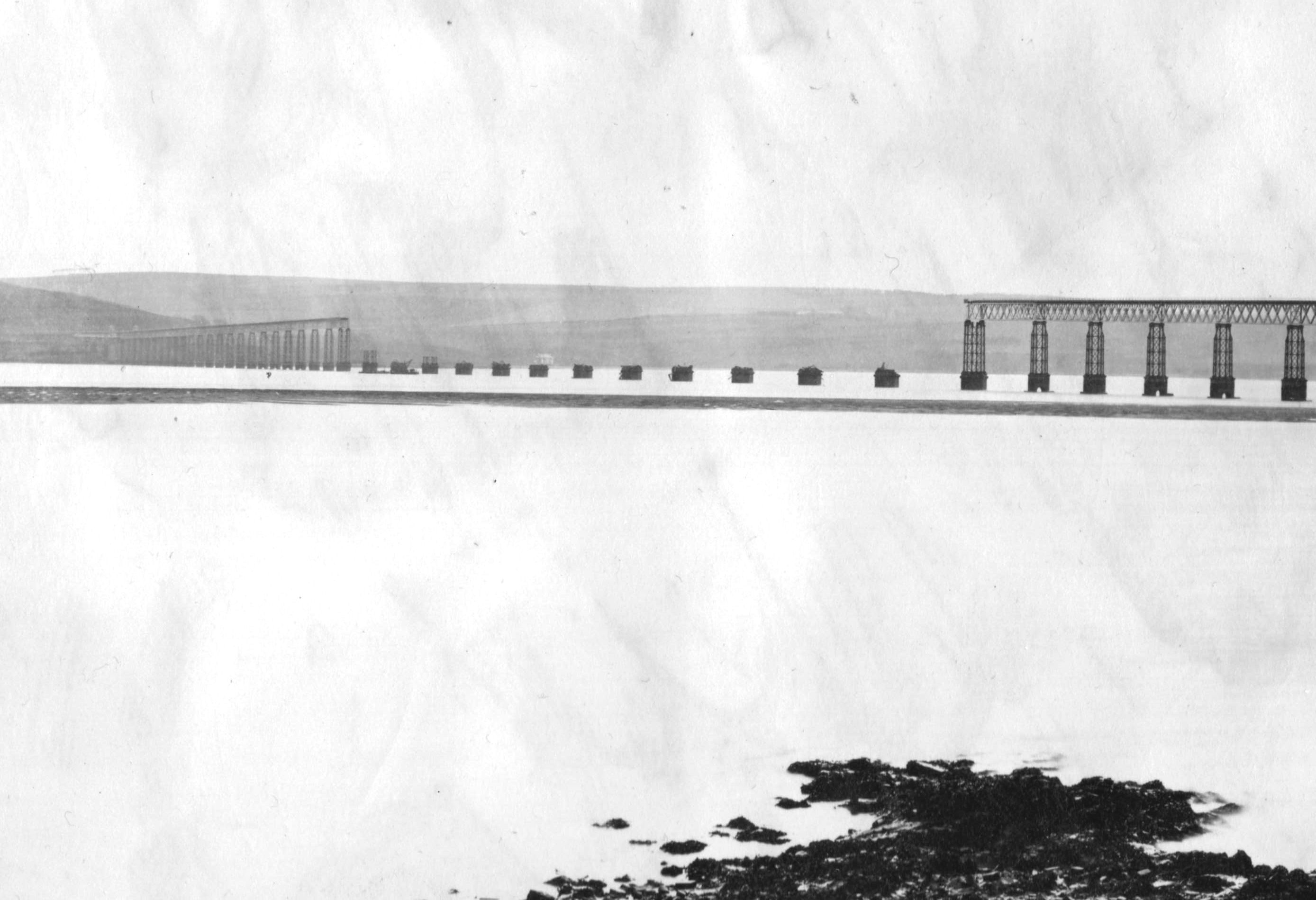
Fallen Tay Bridge from the north

Examples of catastrophic failure of engineered structures include:

- The Tay Rail Bridge disaster of 1879, where the center 0.5 miles (0.80 km) of the bridge was completely destroyed while a train was crossing in a storm. The bridge was inadequately designed and its replacement was built as a separate structure upstream of the old.
- The failure of the South Fork Dam in 1889 released 4.8 billion US gallons (18 billion litres) of water and killed over 2,200 people (popularly known as the Johnstown Flood).
- The collapse of the St. Francis Dam in 1928 released 12.4 billion US gallons (47 billion litres) of water, resulting in a death toll of nearly 600 people.
- The collapse of the first Tacoma Narrows Bridge of 1940, where the main deck of the road bridge was totally destroyed by dynamic oscillations in a 40 mph (64 km/h) wind.
- The De Havilland Comet disasters of 1954, later determined to be structural failures due to greater metal fatigue than anticipated.
- The failure of the Banqiao Dam and 61 others in China in 1975, due to Typhoon Nina. Approximately 86,000 people died from flooding and another 145,000 died from subsequent diseases, a total of 231,000 deaths.
- The Hyatt Regency walkway collapse of 1981, where a suspended walkway in a hotel lobby in Kansas City, Missouri, collapsed completely, killing over 100 people on and below the structure.
- The Space Shuttle Challenger disaster of 1986, in which an O-ring of a rocket booster failed, causing the external fuel tank to break up and making the shuttle veer off course, subjecting it to aerodynamic forces beyond design tolerances; the entire crew of 7 and vehicle were lost.
- The nuclear reactor at the Chernobyl power plant, which exploded on April 26, 1986 causing the release of a substantial amount of radioactive materials.
- The collapse of the Warsaw radio mast of 1991, which had up to that point held the title of world's tallest structure.
- The Sampoong Department Store collapse of 1995, which happened due to structural weaknesses, killed 502 people and injured 937.
- The terrorist attacks and subsequent fire at the World Trade Center on September 11, 2001, weakened the floor joists to the point of catastrophic failure.
- The Space Shuttle Columbia disaster of 2003, where damage to a wing during launch resulted in total loss upon re-entry.
- The collapse of the multi-span I-35W Mississippi River bridge on August 1, 2007.
- The collapse of the Olivos-Tezonco Mexico City Metro overpass of 2021, which had structurally weakened over the years.

== See also ==
- Dragon King Theory
- List of bridge disasters
- Progressive collapse
- Seismic performance
- Structural collapse
- Structural failure
- Resonance disaster
- Risks to civilization, humans and planet Earth
