= Laurens de Haan =

Dutch economist (born 1937)

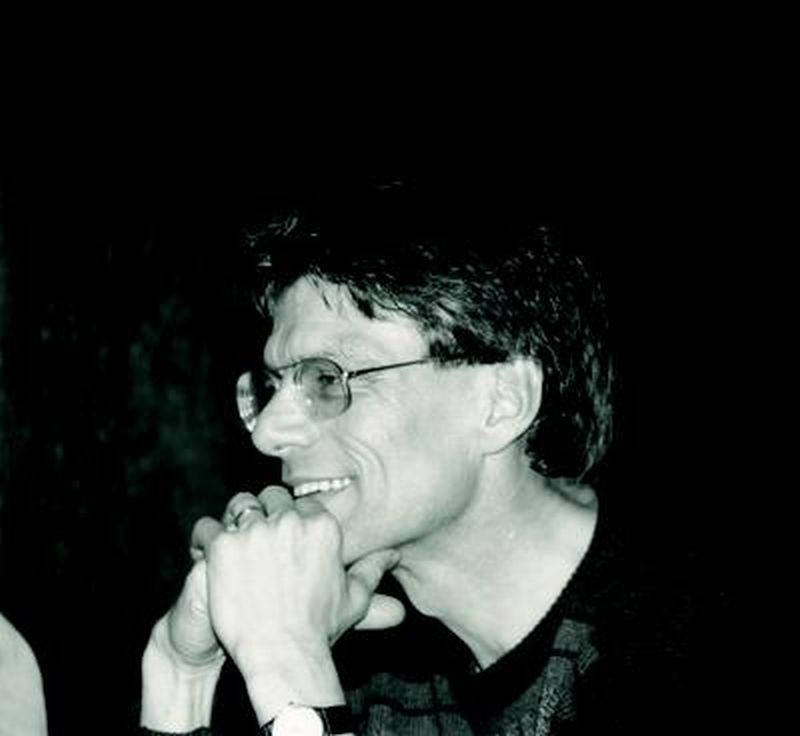
- de Haan in 1987
- Born: 15 January 1937 (age 89); Rotterdam
- Education: Vrije Universiteit Amsterdam
- Known for: Pickands–Balkema–De Haan theorem
- Scientific career
- Fields: Mathematics
- Workplaces: University of Amsterdam
- Doctoral advisor: Johannes Runnenburg
- Website: personal.eur.nl/ldehaan/

Laurens de Haan (born 15 January 1937) is a Dutch economist and Emeritus Professor of Probability and Mathematical Statistics at the Erasmus University Rotterdam, specializing in extreme value theory.

== Biography ==
Born in Rotterdam, De Haan received his MA in mathematics from the University of Amsterdam in 1966, and his PhD in mathematics in 1970 under supervision of Johannes Runnenburg for the thesis "On regular variation and sample extremes".

De Haan started his academic career in 1966 as researcher in probability and statistics at the Mathematisch Centrum, Amsterdam. In the year 1971–72 he was visiting assistant professor at Stanford University. In 1977 he was appointed professor of probability and mathematical statistics at the Erasmus Universiteit, where he stayed until his retirement in 1998. From 1990 to 1992 he was associate dean of the School of Economics. From 2008 to 2011 he was part-time professor of statistics at the University of Tilburg.

In 1977 he was elected Fellow of the Institute of Mathematical Statistics (I.M.S.), and he was guest professor at Peking University in 1994. He was awarded a Doctor honoris causa from the Universidade de Lisboa in 2000 and the Medallion lecture at the I.M.S. annual meeting in Gothenburg in 2000.

== Work ==
=== Overschrijdingslijnen project ===
The "Overschrijdingslijnen" was a research project based on extreme-value analysis, meant to provide new standards for the Dutch sea defenses. It was commissioned by the Ministry of Public Works, starting in 1984 and finished in 1992.

In this joint project people participated from "Rijkswaterstaat", the Dutch government agency overseeing the sea defenses; the Royal Netherlands Meteorological service; and the CWI Centre for Mathematics and Computer Science in Amsterdam.

=== Neptune ===
Neptune was a larger scale but similar project, sponsored by the European Union via the MAST program and in cooperation with BMT Port & Coastal Limited, Delft Hydraulics, Rijkswaterstaat, GKSS-Forschungszentrum Geest-hacht GmbH, University of Lancaster and University of East Anglia. Novel aspects are: firstly the wide-ranging set-up starting from climatological data going down to the water levels and movements near the British and Dutch coasts and secondly the higher-dimensional statistical set-up in the extreme-value analysis (1995-1997). Finished March 1997.

=== Other projects ===
Other projects were initiated, such as:

- NATO collaborative research grant (1991-1995) with Sidney Resnick, Cornell University.
- European Union grant "Training through research" (cat. 40) in the "Training and Mobility of Researchers" program. University of Lisbon, January through June 1997.
- Extreme interest rates, a project for ING insurance company; jointly with H. Drees, Heidelberg (1999-2000).

== Publications ==
De Haan published multiple books. A selection:

- 1970. On regular variation and its application to the weak convergence of sample extremes. Mathematical Centre tracts
- 1979. A simple asymptotic estimate for the index of a stable distribution. Technical report. Dept. of Statistics, Colorado State University.
- 1987. Estimates of the rate of convergence for max-stable processes. Report Econometric Institute.
- 1987. On regular variation of probability densities. Report Econometric Institute
- 2006. Extreme Value Theory: An Introduction. With Ana Ferreira. Springer Series in Operations Research and Financial Engineering.
