= Generalized extreme value distribution =

Family of probability distributions

- Notation: $\textrm{GEV}(\mu, \sigma, \xi)$
- Parameters: $\mu \in \mathbb{R}\$ (location) $\sigma > 0 ~~$ (scale) $\xi \in \mathbb{R}$ (shape)
- Support: $$\begin{cases} x \in \big[ \mu - \tfrac{\sigma}{\xi}, +\infty\big) & \text{ when } & ~ \xi > 0 \\ x \in (-\infty, \infty)                             & \text{ when } & ~ \xi = 0 \\ x \in \big(-\infty, \mu - \tfrac{\sigma}{\xi}\big]  & \text{ when } & ~ \xi < 0 \end{cases}$$
- PDF: $\tfrac{1}{\sigma} \, t(x)^{\xi + 1}\,\mathrm{e}^{-t(x)}$ where $$~~ t(x) = \begin{cases} \left[ 1 + \xi \left( \tfrac{x - \mu}{\sigma} \right) \right]^{-1/\xi} & \text{if } ~ \xi \neq 0 \\ \exp\left(-\tfrac{x - \mu}{\sigma} \right)                             & \text{if } ~ \xi = 0 \end{cases}$$
- CDF: $\mathrm{e}^{-t(x)} ~$ for $~ x\ ~$ in the support (see above)
- Mean: $$\begin{cases} \mu + \dfrac{\sigma(g_1 - 1)}{\xi} & \text{if } ~~ \xi \neq 0\ ,~ \xi < 1 \\ \mu + \sigma\gamma ~ & \text{if } ~ \xi = 0 \\ \infty & \text{if } ~ \xi \geq 1 \end{cases}$$ where $~ g_k = \Gamma(1 - k\xi) ~$ (see Gamma function) and $~ \gamma$ is Euler's constant
- Median: $$\begin{cases}\mu + \sigma \, \dfrac{(\ln2)^{-\xi} - 1}{\xi} ~ & \text{if } ~ \xi \neq 0 \\ \mu - \sigma \ln\ln 2 ~ & \text{if } ~ \xi = 0 \end{cases}$$
- Mode: $$\begin{cases}\mu + \sigma\, \dfrac{( 1 + \xi)^{-\xi} - 1}{\xi} & \text{if } ~ \xi \neq 0 \\ \mu ~~ & \text{if } ~~ \xi = 0 \end{cases}$$
- Variance: $$\begin{cases} \sigma^2 \, \dfrac{g_2 - g_1^2}{\xi^2} & \text{if } ~ \xi \neq 0 ~ \text{ and } ~ \xi < \tfrac{1}{2} \\ \sigma^2 \, \frac{\pi^2}{6} ~ & \text{if } ~ \xi = 0 \\ \infty ~ &  \text{if } ~ \xi \geq \tfrac{1}{2} \end{cases}$$
- Skewness: $$\begin{cases} \sgn(\xi) \, \dfrac{g_3 - 3 g_2 g_1 + 2 g_1^3}{(g_2 - g_1^2)^{3/2}} ~ & \text{if } ~ \xi \neq 0 ~~ \text{ and } ~~ \xi < \tfrac{1}{3}  \\ \dfrac{12 \sqrt{6} \, \zeta(3)}{\pi^3} ~~ & \text{if } ~~ \xi = 0 \end{cases}$$ where $~ \sgn(x) ~$ is the sign function and $~ \zeta(x) ~$ is the Riemann zeta function
- Excess kurtosis: $$\begin{cases} \dfrac{g_4 - 4 g_3 g_1 + 6 g_1^2 g_2 - 3 g_1^4}{(g_2 - g_1^2)^2} ~ & \text{if } ~ \xi \neq 0 ~ \text{ and } ~ \xi < \tfrac{1}{4} \\ \tfrac{12}{5} ~ & \text{if } ~ \xi = 0 \end{cases}$$
- Entropy: $\ln(\sigma) + \gamma\xi + \gamma + 1$
- MGF: see Muraleedharan, Guedes Soares & Lucas (2011)
- CF: see Muraleedharan, Guedes Soares & Lucas (2011)

In probability theory and statistics, the generalized extreme value (GEV) distribution is a family of continuous probability distributions developed within extreme value theory to combine the Gumbel, Fréchet and Weibull families also known as type I, II and III extreme value distributions. By the extreme value theorem the GEV distribution is the only possible limit distribution of properly normalized maxima of a sequence of independent and identically distributed random variables. Note that a limit distribution needs to exist, which requires regularity conditions on the tail of the distribution. Despite this, the GEV distribution is often used as an approximation to model the maxima of long (finite) sequences of random variables.

In some fields of application the generalized extreme value distribution is known as the Fisher–Tippett distribution, named after R.A. Fisher and L.H.C. Tippett who recognised three different forms outlined below. However use of this name is sometimes restricted to mean the special case of the Gumbel distribution. The origin of the common functional form for all three distributions dates back to at least Jenkinson (1955), though allegedly it could also have been given by von Mises (1936).

== Specification ==
Using the standardized variable $\ s \equiv \tfrac{x - \mu}{\sigma}\ ,$ where $\ \mu\ ,$ is the location parameter and can be any real number, and $\ \sigma > 0\ ,$ is the scale parameter; the cumulative distribution function of the GEV distribution is then

$$F(s; \xi) = \begin{cases} \exp (-\mathrm{e}^{-s}) \quad & \text{for } \quad \xi = 0\ , \\
\exp \bigl( \! - ( 1 + \xi s)^{-1/\xi} \bigr) & \text{for } \quad \xi \neq 0 ~~ \text{ and } ~~ \xi s > -1\ , \\
0 & \text{for } \quad \xi > 0 ~~ \text{ and } ~~ s \le -\tfrac{1}{\xi}\ , \\
1 & \text{for } \quad \xi < 0 ~~ \text{ and } ~~ s \ge \tfrac{1}{|\xi|}\ , \end{cases}$$

where $\ \xi\ ,$ the shape parameter, can be any real number. Thus, for $\ \xi > 0\ ,$ the expression is valid for $\ s > -\tfrac{1}{\xi}\ ,$ while for $\ \xi < 0\ ,$ it is valid for $\ s < - \tfrac{1}{\xi} ~.$ In the first case, $\ -\tfrac{1}{\xi}\$ is the negative, lower end-point, where $\ F\$ is 0; in the second case, $\ -\tfrac{1}{\xi}\$ is the positive, upper end-point, where $F$ is 1. For $\ \xi = 0\ ,$, the second expression is formally undefined and is replaced with the first expression, which is the result of taking the limit of the second, as $\ \xi \to 0\$ in which case $\ s\$ can be any real number.

In the special case of $\ x = \mu\ ,$ we have $\ s = 0\ ,$ so then $\ F(0; \xi) = \mathrm{e}^{-1} \approx 0.368\$ regardless of the values of $\ \xi\$ and $\ \sigma ~.$

The probability density function of the standardized distribution is

$$f(s; \xi) = \begin{cases} \mathrm{e}^{-s} \exp (-\mathrm{e}^{-s} ) & \text{for } \quad \xi = 0\ , \\
(1 + \xi s)^{-( 1 + 1/\xi )} \exp\bigl(\! -( 1 + \xi s )^{-1/\xi} \bigr) & \text{for } \quad \xi \neq 0 ~~ \text{ and } ~~  \xi s > -1\ , \\
0 & \text{otherwise;} \end{cases}$$

again valid for $\ s > -\tfrac{1}{\xi}\$ in the case $\ \xi > 0\$, and for $\ s < -\tfrac{1}{\xi}\$ in the case $\ \xi < 0 ~.$ The density is zero outside of the relevant range. In the case $\ \xi = 0\ ,$ the density is positive on the whole real line.

Since the cumulative distribution function is invertible, the quantile function for the GEV distribution has an explicit expression, namely

$$Q(p; \mu, \sigma, \xi) =
\begin{cases}
\mu - \sigma\ \ln ( -\ln p ) ~~ & \text{for } ~~ \xi = 0 ~~ \text{ and } ~~ p \in (0, 1)\ , \\
\mu + \dfrac{\sigma}{\xi} \Big(\ ( -\ln p)^{-\xi} - 1\ \Big) ~~ & \text{for } ~~ \xi > 0 ~~ \text{ and } ~~ p \in [0, 1)\ , ~~ \text{ or for } ~~ \xi < 0 ~~ \text{ and } ~~ p \in (0, 1] ;
\end{cases}$$

and therefore the quantile density function $\ q = \tfrac{\mathrm{d}Q}{\mathrm{d}p}\$ is

$$q(p; \sigma, \xi) = \frac{\sigma}{(-\ln p)^{\xi + 1} \,p} \qquad \text{for } p \in (0, 1)\ ,$$

valid for $\ \sigma > 0\$ and for any real $\ \xi ~.$

== Summary statistics ==
Using $g_k \equiv \Gamma(1 - k\xi)$ for $~ k \in\{1, 2, 3, 4\}\ ,$ where $\Gamma(\cdot)$ is the gamma function, some simple statistics of the distribution are given by:

$\operatorname{\mathbb E}( X ) = \mu + (g_1 - 1) \, \frac{\sigma}{ \xi } \quad$ for $\xi < 1\ ,$
$$\operatorname{Var}( X ) = (g_2 - g_1^2) \, \frac{\sigma^2}{\xi^2}\ ,$$
$$\operatorname{Mode}( X ) = \mu + \bigl(( 1 + \xi )^{-\xi} - 1\bigr) \, \frac{\sigma}{ \xi } ~.$$

The skewness is

$$\ \operatorname{skewness}( X ) = \begin{cases}
\dfrac{g_3 - 3g_2 g_1 + 2g_1^3}{(g_2 - g_1^2)^{3/2} } \cdot \sgn(\xi) & \xi \ne 0\ , \\
\dfrac{12\sqrt{6} \, \zeta(3)}{\pi^3} \approx 1.14 & \xi = 0  ~.
\end{cases}$$

The excess kurtosis is:

$$\ \operatorname{kurtosis\ excess}( X ) = \frac{g_4 - 4g_3 g_1 + 6g_2 g_1^2 - 3g_1^4}{(g_2 - g_1^2)^2 } - 3 ~.$$

== Link to Fréchet, Weibull, and Gumbel families ==
The shape parameter $\ \xi\$ governs the tail behavior of the distribution. The sub-families defined by three cases: $\ \xi = 0\ ,$ $\ \xi > 0\ ,$ and $\ \xi < 0\ ;$ these correspond, respectively, to the Gumbel, Fréchet, and Weibull families, whose cumulative distribution functions are displayed below.

- Type I or Gumbel extreme value distribution, case $~ \xi = 0\ , \quad$ for all $\quad x \in \Bigl(\ -\infty\ ,\ +\infty\ \Bigr)\ :$

$$F(\ x;\ \mu,\ \sigma,\ 0\ ) = \exp \left( - \exp \left( -\frac{\ x - \mu\ }{\sigma} \right)  \right) ~.$$

- Type II or Fréchet extreme value distribution, case $~ \xi > 0\ , \quad$ for all $\quad x \in \left(\ \mu - \tfrac{\sigma}{\ \xi\ }\ ,\ +\infty\ \right)\ :$

Let $\quad \alpha \equiv \tfrac{\ 1\ }{ \xi } > 0 \quad$ and $\quad y \equiv 1 + \tfrac{\xi}{\sigma} (x-\mu)\ ;$
$$F(\ x;\ \mu,\ \sigma,\ \xi\ ) = \begin{cases} 0 & y \leq 0 \quad \mathsf{~ or\ equiv. ~} \quad x \leq \mu - \tfrac{\sigma}{\ \xi\ } \\ \exp\left( -\frac{1}{~ y^\alpha\ } \right) & y > 0 \quad \mathsf{~ or\ equiv. ~} \quad x > \mu - \tfrac{\sigma}{\ \xi\ } ~. \end{cases}$$

- Type III or reversed Weibull extreme value distribution, case $~ \xi < 0\ , \quad$ for all $\quad x \in \left( -\infty\ ,\ \mu + \tfrac{ \sigma }{\ |\ \xi\ |\ }\ \right)\ :$

Let $\quad \alpha \equiv - \tfrac{1}{\ \xi\ } > 0 \quad$ and $\quad y \equiv 1 - \tfrac{\ |\ \xi\ |\ }{\sigma} (x - \mu)\ ;$
$$F(\ x;\ \mu,\ \sigma,\ \xi\ ) = \begin{cases} \exp\left( -y^{\alpha} \right) & y > 0 \quad \mathsf{~ or\ equiv. ~} \quad x < \mu + \tfrac{ \sigma }{\ |\ \xi\ |\ } \\ 1 & y \leq 0  \quad \mathsf{~ or\ equiv. ~} \quad x \geq \mu + \tfrac{ \sigma }{\ |\ \xi\ |\ } ~. \end{cases}$$

The subsections below remark on properties of these distributions.

=== Modification for minima rather than maxima ===
The theory here relates to data maxima and the distribution being discussed is an extreme value distribution for maxima. A generalised extreme value distribution for data minima can be obtained, for example by substituting $\ -x\;$ for $\;x\;$ in the distribution function, and subtracting the cumulative distribution from one: That is, replace $\ F(x)\$ with $\ 1 - F(-x)\$ . Doing so yields yet another family of distributions.

=== Alternative convention for the Weibull distribution ===
The ordinary Weibull distribution arises in reliability applications and is obtained from the distribution here by using the variable $\ t = \mu - x\ ,$ which gives a strictly positive support, in contrast to the use in the formulation of extreme value theory here. This arises because the ordinary Weibull distribution is used for cases that deal with data minima rather than data maxima. The distribution here has an addition parameter compared to the usual form of the Weibull distribution and, in addition, is reversed so that the distribution has an upper bound rather than a lower bound. Importantly, in applications of the GEV, the upper bound is unknown and so must be estimated, whereas when applying the ordinary Weibull distribution in reliability applications the lower bound is usually known to be zero.

=== Ranges of the distributions ===
Note the differences in the ranges of interest for the three extreme value distributions: Gumbel is unlimited, Fréchet has a lower limit, while the reversed Weibull has an upper limit. More precisely, univariate extreme value theory describes which of the three is the limiting law according to the initial law X and in particular depending on the original distribution's tail.

=== Distribution of log variables ===
One can link the type I to types II and III in the following way: If the cumulative distribution function of some random variable $\ X\$ is of type II, and with the positive numbers as support, i.e. $\ F(\ x;\ 0,\ \sigma,\ \alpha\ )\ ,$ then the cumulative distribution function of $\ln X$ is of type I, namely $\ F(\ x;\ \ln \sigma,\ \tfrac{1}{\ \alpha\ },\ 0\ ) ~.$ Similarly, if the cumulative distribution function of $\ X\$ is of type III, and with the negative numbers as support, i.e. $\ F(\ x;\ 0,\ \sigma,\ -\alpha\ )\ ,$ then the cumulative distribution function of $\ \ln (-X)\$ is of type I, namely $\ F(\ x;\ -\ln \sigma,\ \tfrac{\ 1\ }{\alpha},\ 0\ ) ~.$

== Link to logit models (logistic regression) ==
Multinomial logit models, and certain other types of logistic regression, can be phrased as latent variable models with error variables distributed as Gumbel distributions (type I generalized extreme value distributions). This phrasing is common in the theory of discrete choice models, which include logit models, probit models, and various extensions of them, and derives from the fact that the difference of two type-I GEV-distributed variables follows a logistic distribution, of which the logit function is the quantile function. The type-I GEV distribution thus plays the same role in these logit models as the normal distribution does in the corresponding probit models.

== Properties ==
The cumulative distribution function of the generalized extreme value distribution solves the stability postulate equation. The generalized extreme value distribution is a special case of a max-stable distribution, and is a transformation of a min-stable distribution.

== Applications ==
- The GEV distribution is widely used in the treatment of "tail risks" in fields ranging from insurance to finance. In the latter case, it has been considered as a means of assessing various financial risks via metrics such as value at risk.

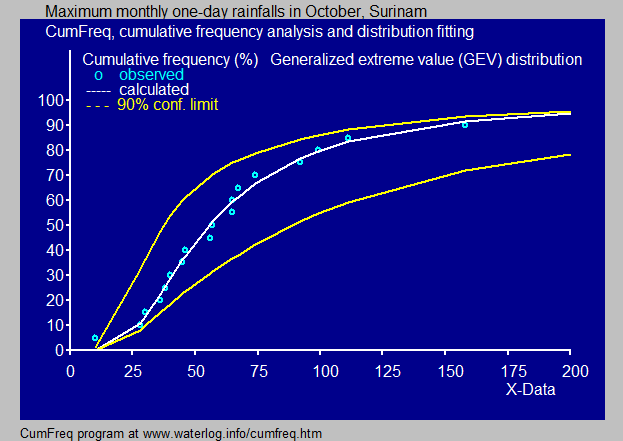
Fitted GEV probability distribution to monthly maximum one-day rainfalls in October, Surinam

- However, the resulting shape parameters have been found to lie in the range leading to undefined means and variances, which underlines the fact that reliable data analysis is often impossible.
- In hydrology the GEV distribution is applied to extreme events such as annual maximum one-day rainfalls and river discharges. The blue picture illustrates an example of fitting the GEV distribution to ranked annually maximum one-day rainfalls showing also the 90% confidence belt based on the binomial distribution. The rainfall data are represented by plotting positions as part of the cumulative frequency analysis.

=== Prediction ===
- It is often of interest to predict probabilities of out-of-sample data under the assumption that both the training data and the out-of-sample data follow a GEV distribution.
- Predictions of probabilities generated by substituting maximum likelihood estimates of the GEV parameters into the cumulative distribution function ignore parameter uncertainty. As a result, the probabilities are not well calibrated, do not reflect the frequencies of out-of-sample events, and, in particular, underestimate the probabilities of out-of-sample tail events.
- Predictions generated using the objective Bayesian approach of calibrating prior prediction have been shown to greatly reduce this underestimation, although not completely eliminate it. Calibrating prior prediction is implemented in the R software package fitdistcp.

=== Example for Normally distributed variables ===
Let $\ \left\{\ X_i\ \big|\ 1 \le i \le n\ \right\}\$ be i.i.d. normally distributed random variables with mean 0 and variance 1. The Fisher–Tippett–Gnedenko theorem tells us that $\ \max \{\ X_i\ \big|\ 1 \le i \le n\ \} \sim GEV(\mu_n, \sigma_n, 0)\ ,$ where

$$\begin{align}
\mu_n &= \Phi^{-1}\left( 1 - \frac{\ 1\ }{ n } \right) \\
\sigma_n &= \Phi^{-1}\left( 1 - \frac{ 1 }{\ n\ \mathrm{e}\ } \right)- \Phi^{-1}\left(1-\frac{\ 1\ }{ n } \right) ~.
\end{align}$$

This allow us to estimate e.g. the mean of $\ \max \{\ X_i\ \big|\ 1 \le i \le n\ \}\$ from the mean of the GEV distribution:

$$\begin{align}
\operatorname{\mathbb E}\left\{\ \max\left\{\ X_i\ \big|\ 1 \le i \le n\ \right\}\ \right\}
& \approx \mu_n + \gamma_{\mathsf E}\ \sigma_n \\
&= (1 - \gamma_{\mathsf E})\ \Phi^{-1}\left( 1 - \frac{\ 1\ }{ n } \right) + \gamma_{\mathsf E}\ \Phi^{-1}\left( 1 - \frac{1}{\ e\ n\ } \right) \\
&= \sqrt{\log \left(\frac{ n^2 }{\ 2 \pi\ \log \left(\frac{n^2}{2\pi} \right)\ }\right) ~}\ \cdot\ \left(1 + \frac{ \gamma }{\ \log n\ } + \mathcal{o} \left(\frac{ 1 }{\ \log n\ } \right) \right)\ ,
\end{align}$$

where $\ \gamma_{\mathsf E}\$ is the Euler–Mascheroni constant.

== Related distributions ==
1. If $\ X \sim \textrm{GEV}(\mu,\,\sigma,\,\xi)\$ then $\ m X + b \sim \textrm{GEV}(m \mu+b,\ |m|\sigma,\ \xi)\$
2. If $\ X \sim \textrm{Gumbel}(\mu,\ \sigma)\$ (Gumbel distribution) then $\ X \sim \textrm{GEV}(\mu,\,\sigma,\,0)\$
3. If $\ X \sim \textrm{Weibull}(\sigma,\,\mu)\$ (Weibull distribution) then $\ \mu\left(1-\sigma\log \tfrac{X}{\sigma} \right) \sim \textrm{GEV}(\mu,\,\sigma,\,0)\$
4. If $\ X \sim \textrm{GEV}(\mu,\,\sigma,\,0)\$ then $\ \sigma \exp (-\tfrac{X-\mu}{\mu \sigma} ) \sim \textrm{Weibull}(\sigma,\,\mu)\$ (Weibull distribution)
5. If $\ X \sim \textrm{Exponential}(1)\$ (Exponential distribution) then $\ \mu - \sigma \log X \sim \textrm{GEV}(\mu,\,\sigma,\,0)\$
6. If $\ X \sim \mathrm{Gumbel}(\alpha_X, \beta)\$ and $\ Y \sim \mathrm{Gumbel}(\alpha_Y, \beta)\$ then $\ X-Y \sim \mathrm{Logistic}(\alpha_X-\alpha_Y,\beta)\$ (see Logistic distribution).
7. If $\ X\$ and $\ Y \sim \mathrm{Gumbel}(\alpha, \beta)\$ then $\ X+Y \nsim \mathrm{Logistic}(2 \alpha,\beta)\$ (The sum is not a logistic distribution).

Note that $\ \operatorname{\mathbb E}\{\ X + Y\ \} = 2\alpha+2\beta\gamma \neq 2\alpha = \operatorname{\mathbb E}\left\{\ \operatorname{Logistic}(2 \alpha,\beta)\ \right\} ~.$

=== Proofs ===
4. Let $\ X \sim \textrm{ Weibull }(\sigma,\,\mu)\ ,$ then the cumulative distribution of $\ g(x) = \mu\left(1-\sigma\log\frac{X}{\sigma} \right)\$ is:

$$\begin{align}
\operatorname{\mathbb P}\left\{\ \mu \left(1-\sigma\log\frac{\ X\ }{ \sigma } \right) < x\ \right\} &= \operatorname{\mathbb P}\left\{\ \log\frac{X}{\sigma} > \frac{1 - x/\mu}{\sigma}\ \right\} \\ {} \\
& \mathsf{\ Since\ the\ logarithm\ is\ always\ increasing:\ } \\ {} \\
&= \operatorname{\mathbb P}\left\{\ X > \sigma \exp\left[ \frac{1 - x/\mu}{\sigma} \right]\ \right\} \\
&= \exp\left(  - \left(\cancel{\sigma} \exp\left[ \frac{1 - x/\mu}{\sigma} \right] \cdot \cancel{\frac{1}{\sigma}} \right)^\mu \right) \\
&= \exp\left(  - \left( \exp\left[ \frac{\cancelto{\mu}{1} - x/\cancel{\mu}}{\sigma} \right] \right)^\cancel{\mu} \right) \\
&= \exp\left(  - \exp\left[ \frac{\mu - x}{\sigma} \right] \right) \\
&= \exp\left(  - \exp\left[ - s \right] \right), \quad s = \frac{x - \mu}{\sigma}\ ,
\end{align}$$
which is the cdf for $\sim \textrm{GEV}(\mu,\,\sigma,\,0) ~.$

5. Let $\ X \sim \textrm{Exponential}(1)\ ,$ then the cumulative distribution of $\ g(X) = \mu - \sigma \log X\$ is:

$$\begin{align}
\operatorname{\mathbb P}\left\{\ \mu - \sigma \log X < x\ \right\} &= \operatorname{\mathbb P}\left\{\ \log X > \frac{\mu - x}{\sigma}\ \right\} \\ {} \\
&  \mathsf{\ Since\ the\ logarithm\ is\ always\ increasing:\ } \\ {} \\
&= \operatorname{\mathbb P}\left\{\ X > \exp\left( \frac{\ \mu - x\ }{ \sigma } \right)\ \right\} \\
&= \exp\left[- \exp\left( \frac{\ \mu - x\ }{ \sigma } \right) \right] \\
&= \exp\left[- \exp(-s) \right]\ , \quad ~\mathsf{ where }~  \quad s \equiv \frac{x - \mu}{\sigma}\ ;
\end{align}$$
which is the cumulative distribution of $\ \operatorname{GEV}(\mu, \sigma, 0) ~.$

== See also ==
- Extreme value theory (univariate theory)
- Fisher–Tippett–Gnedenko theorem
- Generalized Pareto distribution
- German tank problem, opposite question of population maximum given sample maximum
- Pickands–Balkema–De Haan theorem
