= Generalized multivariate log-gamma distribution =

In probability theory and statistics, the generalized multivariate log-gamma (G-MVLG) distribution is a multivariate distribution introduced by Demirhan and Hamurkaroglu in 2011. The G-MVLG is a flexible distribution. Skewness and kurtosis are well controlled by the parameters of the distribution. This enables one to control dispersion of the distribution. Because of this property, the distribution is effectively used as a joint prior distribution in Bayesian analysis, especially when the likelihood is not from the location-scale family of distributions such as normal distribution.

== Joint probability density function ==
If $\boldsymbol{Y} \sim \mathrm{G}\text{-}\mathrm{MVLG}(\delta,\nu,\boldsymbol{\lambda},\boldsymbol{\mu})$, the joint probability density function (pdf) of $\boldsymbol{Y}=(Y_{1},\dots,Y_{k})$ is given as the following:

$$f(y_1,\dots,y_k)= \delta^{\nu}\sum_{n=0}^\infty \frac{(1-\delta)^{n}
\prod_{i=1}^k \mu_i \lambda_i^{-\nu-n}}{[\Gamma(\nu+n)]^{k-1}\Gamma(\nu)n!}
\exp\bigg\{(\nu +n)\sum_{i=1}^k \mu_i y_i - \sum_{i=1}^k \frac{1}{\lambda_i}\exp\{\mu_i y_i\}\bigg\},$$

where $\boldsymbol{y}\in \mathbb{R}^{k}, \nu>0, \lambda_{j}>0, \mu_{j}>0$ for $j=1,\dots,k, \delta=\det(\boldsymbol{\Omega})^{\frac{1}{k-1}},$ and

$$\boldsymbol{\Omega}=\left(
\begin{array}{cccc}
1 & \sqrt{\mathrm{abs}(\rho_{12})} & \cdots & \sqrt{\mathrm{abs}(\rho_{1k})} \\
\sqrt{\mathrm{abs}(\rho_{12})} & 1 & \cdots & \sqrt{\mathrm{abs}(\rho_{2k})} \\
\vdots & \vdots & \ddots & \vdots \\
\sqrt{\mathrm{abs}(\rho_{1k})} & \sqrt{\mathrm{abs}(\rho_{2k})} & \cdots & 1
\end{array}
\right),$$

$\rho_{ij}$ is the correlation between $Y_i$ and $Y_j$, $\det(\cdot)$ and $\mathrm{abs}(\cdot)$ denote determinant and absolute value of inner expression, respectively, and $\boldsymbol{g}=(\delta,\nu,\boldsymbol{\lambda}^T,\boldsymbol{\mu}^T)$ includes parameters of the distribution.

== Properties ==
=== Joint moment generating function ===
The joint moment generating function of G-MVLG distribution is as the following:

$$M_{\boldsymbol{Y}}(\boldsymbol{t}) =\delta^\nu \bigg(\prod_{i=1}^k
\lambda_i^{t_i/\mu_i}\bigg)\sum_{n=0}^\infty \frac{\Gamma(\nu +n)}{\Gamma(\nu)n!}
(1-\delta)^n \prod_{i=1}^k \frac{\Gamma(\nu+n+t_i/\mu_i)}{\Gamma(\nu+n)}.$$

=== Marginal central moments ===
$r^\text{th}$ marginal central moment of $Y_i$ is as the following:

$${\mu_i}'_r=\left[\frac{(\lambda_i/\delta)^{t_i/\mu_i}}{\Gamma(\nu)}\sum_{k=0}^r \binom{r}{k}\left[\frac{\ln(\lambda_i/\delta)}{\mu_i}\right]^{r-k}
\frac{\partial^k\Gamma(\nu+t_i/\mu_i)}{\partial t_i^k}\right]_{t_i=0}.$$

=== Marginal expected value and variance ===
Marginal expected value $Y_i$ is as the following:

$$\operatorname{E}(Y_{i})=\frac{1}{\mu_i}\big[\ln(\lambda_i/\delta)+\digamma(\nu)\big],$$
$$\operatorname{var}(Z_i)=\digamma^{[1]}(\nu)/(\mu_i)^2$$

where $\digamma(\nu)$ and $\digamma^{[1]}(\nu)$ are values of digamma and trigamma functions at $\nu$, respectively.

== Related distributions ==
Demirhan and Hamurkaroglu establish a relation between the G-MVLG distribution and the Gumbel distribution (type I extreme value distribution) and gives a multivariate form of the Gumbel distribution, namely the generalized multivariate Gumbel (G-MVGB) distribution. The joint probability density function of $\boldsymbol{T}\sim \mathrm{G}\text{-}\mathrm{MVGB}(\delta,\nu,\boldsymbol{\lambda},\boldsymbol{\mu})$ is the following:

$$f(t_1,\dots,t_k; \delta,\nu,\boldsymbol{\lambda},\boldsymbol{\mu}))= \delta^\nu \sum_{n=0}^\infty \frac{(1-\delta)^n
\prod_{i=1}^k \mu_i \lambda_i^{-\nu-n}}{[\Gamma(\nu+n)]^{k-1}\Gamma(\nu)n!}\exp\bigg\{-(\nu +n)\sum_{i=1}^k \mu_i t_i - \sum_{i=1}^k \frac{1}{\lambda_i} \exp\{-\mu_i t_i\}\bigg\},\quad t_i\in \mathbb{R}.$$

The Gumbel distribution has a broad range of applications in the field of risk analysis. Therefore, the G-MVGB distribution should be beneficial when it is applied to these types of problems.
