= Johannes Runnenburg =

Dutch mathematician

Johannes Theodorus Runnenburg (19 February 1932 – 16 April 2008) was a Dutch mathematician and professor of probability theory and analysis at the University of Amsterdam from 1962 to 1997.

== Biography ==
Born in Amsterdam he received his MA in Mathematics in 1956 at the University of Amsterdam, and his PhD cum laude in Mathematics and Physics in 1960 with a thesis entitled "On the Use of Markov Processes in One-server Waiting-time Problems and Renewal Theory" advised by Nicolaas Govert de Bruijn.

Runnenburg was appointed Lector in Probability theory and analysis at the University of Amsterdam in 1961. In 1962, he was promoted to Professor of Probability theory and analysis, and from 1966 to his retirement in 1997 was Professor of Pure and Applied Mathematics. Among his doctorate students were Gijsbert de Leve (1964), Laurens de Haan (1970), Fred Steutel (1971), Wim Vervaat (1972), August Balkema (1973), Frits Göbel (1974), Arie Hordijk (1974), Aegle Hoekstra (1983), Peter de Jong (1988) and Leo Klein Haneveld (1996).

== Publications ==
- Machines Served by a Patrolling Operator. 1957
- On the use of Markov processes in one-server waiting-time problems and renewal theory. 1960
- Enige voorbeelden van stochastische processen: openbare les Universiteit van Amsterdam. 1961.
- An Example Illustrating the Possibilities of Renewal Theory and Waiting-time Theory for Markov-dependent Arrival-intervals. 1961
- On K.L. Chung's problem of imbedding a time-discrete Markov chain in a time-continuous one for finitely many states. With Carel Louis Scheffer. Amsterdam : Mathematisch Centrum, 1962.
