= Extreme risk =

Low-probability risk of very bad outcomes

Extreme risks are risks of very bad outcomes or "high consequence", but of low probability. They include the risks of terrorist attack, biosecurity risks such as the invasion of pests, and extreme natural disasters such as major earthquakes.

== Introduction ==
The estimation of the probability of extreme events is difficult because of the lack of data: they are events that have not yet happened or have happened only very rarely, so relevant data are scarce. Thus standard statistical methods are generally inapplicable.

== Extreme value theory ==
If there is some relevant data, the probability of events at or beyond the range of the data may be estimated by the statistical methods of extreme value theory, developed for such purposes as predicting 100-year floods from a limited range of data of past floods. In such cases a mathematical function may be fitted to the data and extrapolated beyond the range of the data to estimate the probability of extreme events. The results need to be treated with caution because of the possibility that the largest values in the past are unrepresentative, and the possibility that the behavior of the system has changed.

== Black swan theory ==
In cases where the event of interest is very different from existing experience, there may be no relevant guide in the past data. Nassim Nicholas Taleb argues in his black swan theory that the frequency and impact of totally unexpected events is generally underestimated. With hindsight, they can be explained, but there is no prospect of predicting them.

== Bank operational risk ==
Banks need to evaluate the risk of adverse events other than credit risks and market risks. These risks, called operational risks, include the major events most likely to cause bank failure, such as massive internal fraud. The international compliance regime for banks, Basel II, requires that such risks be quantified using a mixture of statistical theory, such as extreme value theory, and scenario analysis conducted by internal committees of experts. A bank regulator (such as the Federal Reserve in the United States) oversees the result. Negotiations between the parties result in a system that combines quantitative methods with informed and scrutinized expert opinion. This gives the potential to avoid as far as possible the problems caused by the paucity of data and the bias of pure expert opinion.

Similar methods combining quantitative methods with moderated expert opinion have been used to evaluate biosecurity risks such as risks of invasive species that have potentially massive impacts on a country's economy or ecology.

== See also ==
- Global catastrophic risk – Hypothetical global-scale disaster risk
- Hand formula – Legal rationale involving risks, losses and obligations
