= Pickands–Balkema–De Haan theorem =

Second theorem in extreme value theory

The Pickands–Balkema–de Haan theorem gives the asymptotic tail distribution of a random variable when its true distribution is unknown. It is often called the second theorem in extreme value theory. Unlike the first theorem (the Fisher–Tippett–Gnedenko theorem), which concerns the maximum of a sample, the Pickands–Balkema–de Haan theorem describes the values above a threshold.

The theorem owes its name to mathematicians James Pickands, Guus Balkema, and Laurens de Haan.

== Conditional excess distribution function ==
For an unknown distribution function $F$ of a random variable $X$, the Pickands–Balkema–de Haan theorem describes the conditional distribution function $F_u$ of the variable $X$ above a certain threshold $u$. This is the so-called conditional excess distribution function, defined as

$$F_u(\ y\ ) = \operatorname\mathbb{P}\!\Bigl\{\ X-u \leq y ~\vert~ X > u\ \Bigr\} = \frac{\ F(u+y) - F(u)\ }{\ 1 - F(u)\ }$$

for $\ 0 \leq y \leq x_F - u\ ,$ where $\ x_F\$ is either the finite or infinite right endpoint of the underlying distribution $\ F ~.$ The modified function $\ F_u\$ describes the distribution of the excess value over a threshold $\ u\ ,$ given that the threshold is exceeded.

== Statement ==
Let $F_u$ be the conditional excess distribution function. Pickands, Balkema and de Haan posed that for a large class of underlying distribution functions $F$, and large $u$, $F_u$ is well approximated by the generalized Pareto distribution, in the following sense. Suppose that there exist functions $a(u), b(u)$, with $a(u)>0$ such that $F_u(a(u) y+ b(u) )$ as $u \rightarrow \infty$ converge to a non-degenerate distribution, then such limit is equal to the generalized Pareto distribution:

$$F_u(a(u) y+ b(u)) \rightarrow G_{k, \sigma} (y),\text{ as }u \rightarrow \infty$$,

where

- $G_{k, \sigma} (y)= 1-(1+ky/\sigma)^{-1/k}$, if $k \neq 0$
- $G_{k, \sigma} (y)= 1-e^{-y/\sigma}$, if $k = 0.$

Here σ > 0, and y ≥ 0 when k ≥ 0 and 0 ≤ y ≤ −σ/k when k < 0. These special cases are also known as

- Exponential distribution with mean $\sigma$, if k = 0,
- Uniform distribution on $[0,\sigma]$, if k = -1,
- Pareto distribution, if k > 0.

The class of underlying distribution functions $F$ are related to the class of the distribution functions $F$ satisfying the Fisher–Tippett–Gnedenko theorem.

Since a special case of the generalized Pareto distribution is a power-law, the Pickands–Balkema–de Haan theorem is sometimes used to justify the use of a power-law for modeling extreme events.

The theorem has been extended to include a wider range of distributions. While the extended versions cover, for example the normal and log-normal distributions, still continuous distributions exist that are not covered.

== See also ==
- Stable distribution
