= Extreme value theory =

Branch of statistics focusing on large deviations

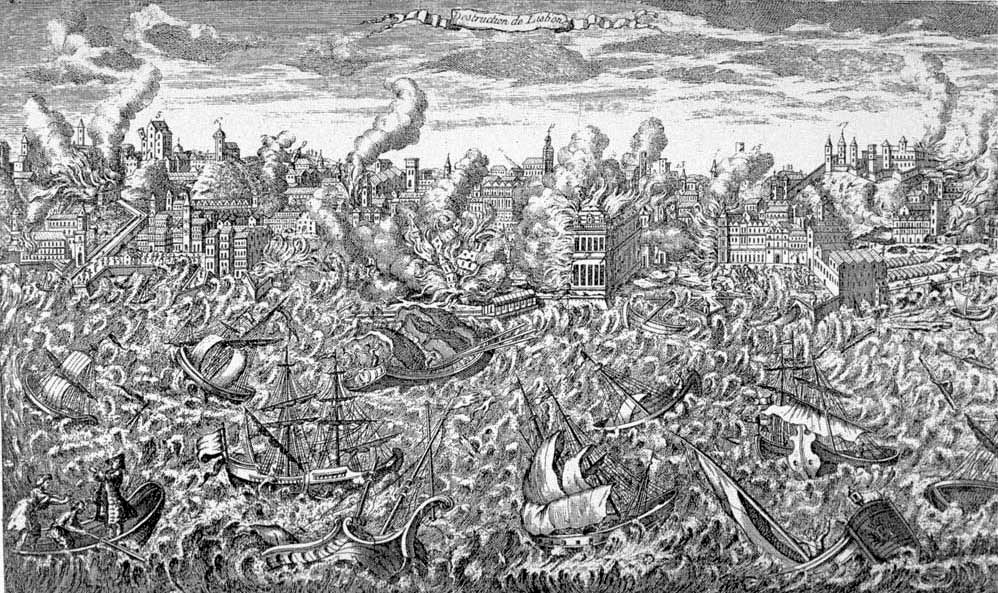
Extreme value theory is used to model the risk of extreme, rare events, such as the 1755 Lisbon earthquake.

Extreme value theory or extreme value analysis (EVA) is the study of extremes in statistical distributions.

It is widely used in many disciplines, such as structural engineering, finance, actuarial science, economics, earth sciences, traffic prediction, and geological engineering. For example, EVA might be used in the field of hydrology to estimate the probability of an unusually large flooding event, such as the 100-year flood. Similarly, for the design of a breakwater, a coastal engineer would seek to estimate the 50 year wave and design the structure accordingly.

== Data analysis ==
Two main approaches exist for practical extreme value analysis.

The first method relies on deriving block maxima (minima) series as a preliminary step. In many situations it is customary and convenient to extract the annual maxima (minima), generating an annual maxima series (AMS).

The second method relies on extracting, from a continuous record, the peak values reached for any period during which values exceed a certain threshold (falls below a certain threshold). This method is generally referred to as the peak over threshold method (POT).

For AMS data, the analysis may partly rely on the results of the Fisher–Tippett–Gnedenko theorem, leading to the generalized extreme value distribution being selected for fitting. However, in practice, various procedures are applied to select between a wider range of distributions. The theorem here relates to the limiting distributions for the minimum or the maximum of a very large collection of independent random variables from the same distribution. Given that the number of relevant random events within a year may be rather limited, it is unsurprising that analyses of observed AMS data often lead to distributions other than the generalized extreme value distribution (GEVD) being selected.

For POT data, the analysis may involve fitting two distributions: One for the number of events in a time period considered and a second for the size of the exceedances.

A common assumption for the first is the Poisson distribution, with the generalized Pareto distribution being used for the exceedances. A tail-fitting can be based on the Pickands–Balkema–de Haan theorem.

Novak (2011) reserves the term "POT method" to the case where the threshold is non-random, and distinguishes it from the case where one deals with exceedances of a random threshold.

== Applications ==
Applications of extreme value theory include predicting the probability distribution of:

- Extreme floods; the size of freak waves
- Tornado outbreaks
- Maximum sizes of ecological populations
- Side effects of drugs (e.g., ximelagatran)
- The magnitudes of large insurance losses
- Equity risks; day-to-day market risk
- Mutation events during evolution
- Large wildfires
- Environmental loads on structures
- Time the fastest humans could ever run the 100 metres sprint and performances in other athletic disciplines
- Pipeline failures due to pitting corrosion
- Anomalous IT network traffic, prevent attackers from reaching important data
- Road safety analysis
- Wireless communications
- Epidemics
- Neurobiology
- Solar energy
- Extreme Space weather
- Weather, extreme temperature/climate change

== History ==
The field of extreme value theory was pioneered by L. Tippett (1902–1985). Tippett was employed by the British Cotton Industry Research Association, where he worked to make cotton thread stronger. In his studies, he realized that the strength of a thread was controlled by the strength of its weakest fibres. With the help of R.A. Fisher, Tippet obtained three asymptotic limits describing the distributions of extremes assuming independent variables. E.J. Gumbel (1958) codified this theory. These results can be extended to allow for slight correlations between variables, but the classical theory does not extend to strong correlations of the order of the variance. One universality class of particular interest is that of log-correlated fields, where the correlations decay logarithmically with the distance.

== Univariate theory ==
The theory for extreme values of a single variable is governed by the extreme value theorem, also called the Fisher–Tippett–Gnedenko theorem, which describes which of the three possible distributions for extreme values applies for a particular statistical variable $X$.

== Multivariate theory ==
Extreme value theory in more than one variable introduces additional issues that have to be addressed. One problem that arises is that one must specify what constitutes an extreme event. Although this is straightforward in the univariate case, there is no unambiguous way to do this in the multivariate case. The fundamental problem is that although it is possible to order a set of real-valued numbers, there is no natural way to order a set of vectors.

As an example, in the univariate case, given a set of observations $\ x_i\$ it is straightforward to find the most extreme event simply by taking the maximum (or minimum) of the observations. However, in the bivariate case, given a set of observations $\ ( x_i, y_i )\$, it is not immediately clear how to find the most extreme event. Suppose that one has measured the values $\ (3, 4)\$ at a specific time and the values $\ (5, 2)\$ at a later time. Which of these events would be considered more extreme? There is no universal answer to this question.

Another issue in the multivariate case is that the limiting model is not as fully prescribed as in the univariate case. In the univariate case, the model (GEV distribution) contains three parameters whose values are not predicted by the theory and must be obtained by fitting the distribution to the data. In the multivariate case, the model not only contains unknown parameters, but also a function whose exact form is not prescribed by the theory. However, this function must obey certain constraints. It is not straightforward to devise estimators that obey such constraints though some have been recently constructed.

As an example of an application, bivariate extreme value theory has been applied to ocean research.

== Non-stationary extremes ==
Statistical modeling for nonstationary time series was developed in the 1990s. Methods for nonstationary multivariate extremes have been introduced more recently. The latter can be used for tracking how the dependence between extreme values changes over time, or over another covariate.

== See also ==
- Extreme risk
- Extreme weather
- Fisher–Tippett–Gnedenko theorem
- Generalized extreme value distribution
- Large deviation theory
- Outlier
- Pareto distribution
- Pickands–Balkema–de Haan theorem
- Rare events
- Redundancy principle
- Extreme value distributions
  - Fréchet distribution
  - Gumbel distribution
  - Weibull distribution

== Sources ==
- Abarbanel, H.; Koonin, S.; Levine, H.; MacDonald, G.; Rothaus, O. (January 1992). "Statistics of extreme events with application to climate" (PDF). JASON. JSR-90-30S.
- Alvarado, Ernesto; Sandberg, David V.; Pickford, Stewart G. (1998). "Modeling Large Forest Fires as Extreme Events" (PDF). Northwest Science. 72: 66–75. Archived from the original (PDF) on 2009-02-26.
- Balkema, A.; de Haan, Laurens (1974). "Residual life time at great age". Annals of Probability. 2 (5): 792–804. doi:10.1214/aop/1176996548. JSTOR 2959306.
- Burry, K.V. (1975). Statistical Methods in Applied Science. Hoboken, NJ: John Wiley & Sons.
- Castillo, E. (1988). Extreme Value Theory in Engineering. New York, NY: Academic Press. ISBN 0-12-163475-2.
- Castillo, E.; Hadi, A.S.; Balakrishnan, N.; Sarabia, J.M. (2005). Extreme Value and Related Models with Applications in Engineering and Science. Wiley Series in Probability and Statistics. Hoboken, NJ: John Wiley's Sons. ISBN 0-471-67172-X.
- de Carvalho, M.; Huser, R.; Naveau, P.; Reich, B. J. (2026). Handbook of Statistics of Extremes. Boca Raton, FL: Chapman & Hall/CRC. ISBN 978-1-0325-1980-7.
- Coles, S. (2001). An Introduction to Statistical Modeling of Extreme Values. London, UK: Springer.
- Embrechts, P.; Klüppelberg, C.; Mikosch, T. (1997). Modelling extremal events for insurance and finance. Berlin, DE: Springer Verlag.
- Fisher, R.A.; Tippett, L.H.C. (1928). "Limiting forms of the frequency distribution of the largest and smallest member of a sample". Proceedings of the Cambridge Philosophical Society. 24 (2): 180–190. Bibcode:1928PCPS...24..180F. doi:10.1017/s0305004100015681. S2CID 123125823.
- Gnedenko, B.V. (1943). "Sur la distribution limite du terme maximum d'une serie aleatoire" [On the limiting distribution(s) of the maximum value of a series ...]. Annals of Mathematics (in French). 44 (3): 423–453. doi:10.2307/1968974. JSTOR 1968974.
- Gumbel, E.J., ed. (1935) [1933–1934]. "Les valeurs extrêmes des distributions statistiques" [The statistical distributions of extreme values] (pdf). Annales de l'Institut Henri Poincaré (conference papers) (in French). 5 (2). France: 115–158 – via numdam.org.
- Gumbel, E.J. (2004) [1958]. Statistics of Extremes (reprint ed.). Mineola, NY: Dover. ISBN 978-0-486-43604-3.
- Makkonen, L. (2008). "Problems in the extreme value analysis". Structural Safety. 30 (5): 405–419. doi:10.1016/j.strusafe.2006.12.001.
- Leadbetter, M.R. (1991). "On a basis for 'peaks over threshold' modeling". Statistics & Probability Letters. 12 (4): 357–362. doi:10.1016/0167-7152(91)90107-3.
- Leadbetter, M.R.; Lindgren, G.; Rootzen, H. (1982). Extremes and Related Properties of Random Sequences and Processes. New York, NY: Springer-Verlag.
- Lindgren, G.; Rootzen, H. (1987). "Extreme values: Theory and technical applications". Scandinavian Journal of Statistics, Theory and Applications. 14: 241–279.
- Novak, S.Y. (2011). Extreme Value Methods with Applications to Finance. London, UK / Boca Raton, FL: Chapman & Hall / CRC Press. ISBN 978-1-4398-3574-6.
- Pickands, J. (1975). "Statistical inference using extreme order statistics". Annals of Statistics. 3: 119–131. doi:10.1214/aos/1176343003.
- Tippett, Michael K.; Lepore, Chiara; Cohen, Joel E. (16 December 2016). "More tornadoes in the most extreme U.S. tornado outbreaks". Science. 354 (6318): 1419–1423. Bibcode:2016Sci...354.1419T. doi:10.1126/science.aah7393. PMID 27934705.

== Software ==
- Belzile, L.R.; Dutang, C.; Northrop, P.J.; Opitz, T. (2023). "A modeler's guide to extreme value software". Extremes. 26 (4): 595–638. arXiv:2205.07714. doi:10.1007/s10687-023-00475-9.
- "Extreme Value Statistics in R". cran.r-project.org (software). 4 November 2023. — Package for extreme value statistics in R.
- "Extremes.jl". github.com (software). — Package for extreme value statistics in Julia.
- "Source code for stationary and non-stationary extreme value analysis". amir.eng.uci.edu (software). Irvine, CA: University of California, Irvine.
