= Vow of allegiance of the Professors of the German Universities and High-Schools to Adolf Hitler and the National Socialistic State =

1933 document signed by German academics

Vow of allegiance of the Professors of the German Universities and High-Schools to Adolf Hitler and the National Socialistic State Bekenntnis der Professoren an den Universitäten und Hochschulen zu Adolf Hitler und dem nationalsozialistischen Staat
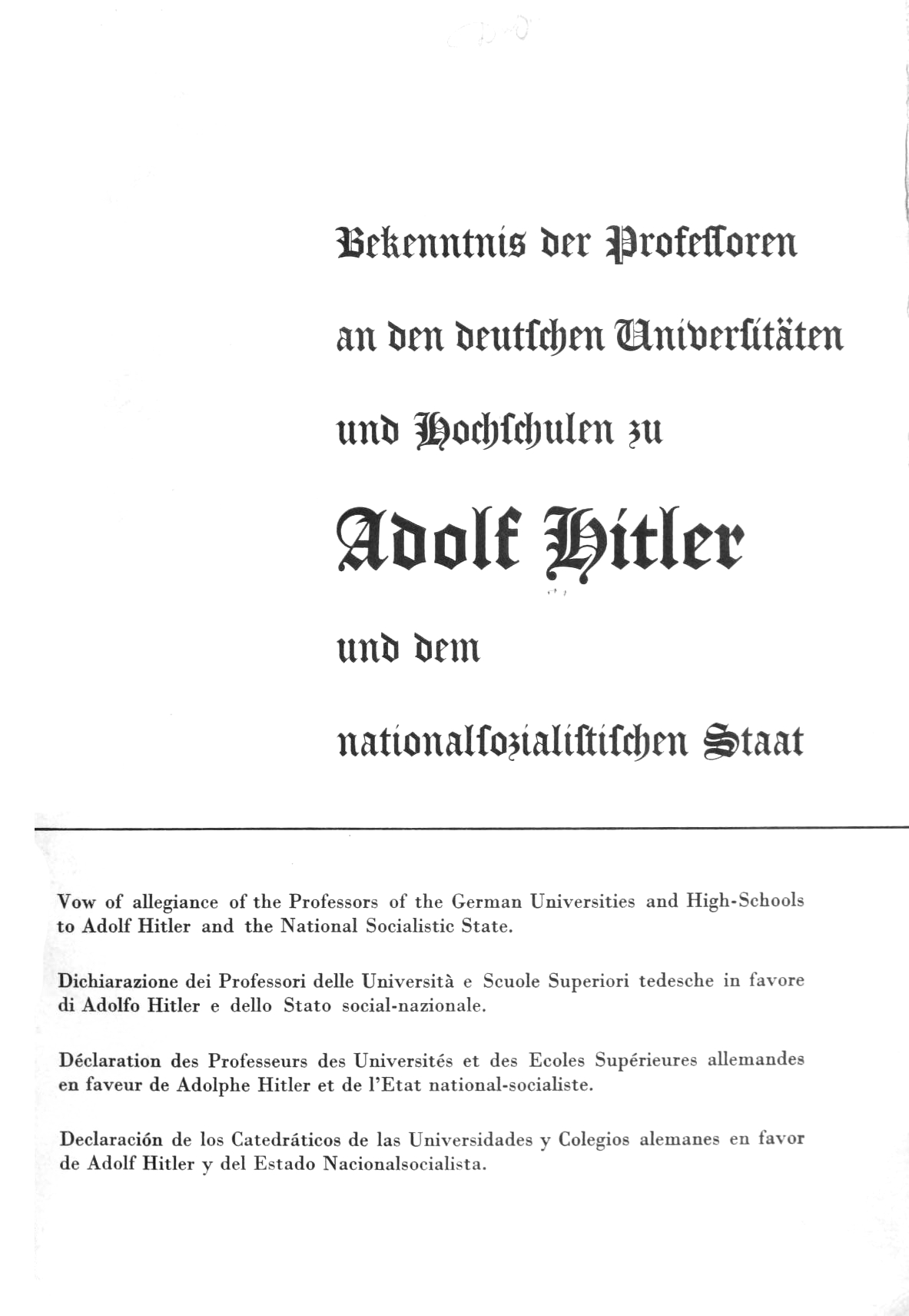
- Title page of the document

Information
- Presented: 11 November 1933
- Languages: German; English; Spanish; Italian

"Bekenntnis der Professoren an den Universitäten und Hochschulen zu Adolf Hitler und dem nationalsozialistischen Staat" officially translated into English as the "Vow of allegiance of the Professors of the German Universities and High-Schools to Adolf Hitler and the National Socialistic State" was a document presented on 11 November 1933 at the Albert Hall in Leipzig. It had statements in German, English, Italian, and Spanish by selected German academics and included an appendix of signatories. The purge to remove academics and civil servants with Jewish ancestry began with the Law for the Restoration of the Professional Civil Service, passed on 7 April 1933. The vow of allegiance was signed by those who remained, in support of Nazi Germany.

Philosopher Martin Heidegger in his inaugural lecture in May 1933 as rector of the University of Freiburg, and who was later in October appointed "Führer of the university", said (translated): "The much celebrated "academic freedom" is being banished from the German university; for this freedom was not genuine, since it was only negative. It meant primarily freedom from concern, arbitrariness of intentions and inclinations, lack of restraint in what was done and left undone. The concept of freedom of the German is now brought back to its truth".

After World War II, Heidegger was dismissed from the university and banned from teaching after denazification hearings at Freiburg.

== List of institutions ==
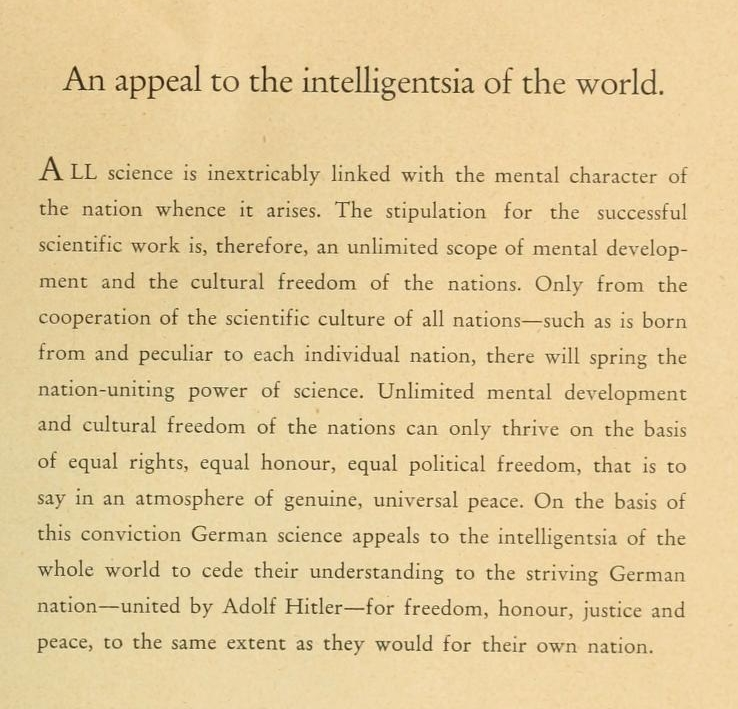
Appeal in English

The academics of the following institutions were included as signatories:

- Deutsche Hochschule für Leibesübungen, Berlin-Charlottenburg
- Hochschule für Lehrerbildung, Bonn
- Georg-August-Universität Göttingen
- Hamburgische Universität
- Hochschule für Lehrerbildung, Kiel
- Veterinärmedizinische Fakultät Leipzig
- Pädagogisches Institut Leipzig
- Universität Marburg
- Pädagogisches Institut Rostock
- Bergakademie Clausthal
- Technische Hochschule Danzig
- Technische Hochschule Dresden
- Pädagogisches Institut, Dresden
- Bergakademie Freiberg i. Sa.
- Technische Hochschule Hannover
- Handelshochschule Berlin
- Handels-Hochschule Leipzig
- Hindenburg-Hochschule Nürnberg
- Landwirtschaftliche Hochschule Bonn-Poppelsdorf
- Forstliche Hochschule Eberswalde
- Technische Hochschule Dresden (Forstliche Hochschule Tharandt)
- Forstliche Hochschule Hann. Münden
- Bischöfliche Philosophisch-Theologische Hochschule Eichstätt i. B.
- Philosophisch-Theologische Hochschule Passau
- Philosophisch-Theologische Hochschule Regensburg
- Philosophisch-Theologische Hochschule Dillingen

== Signatories ==
There were nearly 900 signatories to the document including the following professors and academics apart from some independent scholars.

=== A ===
Karl von der Aa (Leipzig), Narziß Ach (Göttingen psychologist), Eberhard Ackerknecht (Leipzig veterinarian), Gustav Aeckerlein (Freiberg physicist), Friedrich Ahlfeld (Marburg geologist), Karl Albrecht (Hamburg), Karl Alnor (Kiel), Hermann Altrock (Leipzig sports trainer), Friedrich Alverdes (Marburg zoologist), Georg Anschütz (Hamburg psychologist), Christian Aretz (Bonn scientist), Emil Artin (Hamburg mathematician), Richard Augst (Dresden)

=== B ===
Ernst Baars (Marburg chemist), Adolf Bach (Bonn Germanist), Heinrich Barkhausen (Dresden physicist), Sophie Barrelet (Hamburg), Julius Bartels (Eberswald geophysicist), Karl Hugo Friedrich Bauer (Leipzig chemist), Lorenz Bauer (Theologian), Friedrich Baumann (Marburg physician), Karl Baumann (Bonn physicist), Max Baur (Marburg pharmacist), Werner Bavendamm (Dresden botanist), Fritz Beckert (Dresden), Hermann Beenken (Leipzig art historian), Paul Johannes Beger (Hannover mineralogist), Johannes Behm (Göttingen theologist), Carl Julius Peter Behr (Hamburg ophthalmologist), Hans Hermann Bennhold (Hamburg), Ewald Berge (Leipzig veterinarian), Walther Bergt (Dresden geologist), Erhard Berndt (Leipzig agronomist), Georg Berndt (Dresden physicist), Luise Berthold (Marburg Germanist), Helmut Berve (Leipzig historian), Theodor Beste (Dresden administrator), Erich Bethe (Leipzig philologist), Kurt Beyer (Dresden civil engineer), Robert Bierich (Hamburg physician), Wilhelm Biltz (Hannover chemist), Ludwig Binder (Dresden electrotechnician), Lothar Birckenbach (Clausthal chemist), Herbert Birtner (Marburg musicologist), Fritz Blättner (Hamburg teacher), Max Le Blanc (Leipzig chemist), Edwin Blanck (Göttingen soil scientist), Wilhelm Blaschke (Austrian mathematician), Hermann Block (Hamburger teacher), Otto Blum (Hannover civil engineer), Werner Blume (Göttingen anatomist), Paul Böckmann (Hamburg Germanist), Ernst Boehm (Leipzig teacher), Gerhard Bohne (Kiel), Gerrit Bol (Dutch Mathematician, Hamburg), Otto Friedrich Bollnow (Göttingen philosopher), Conrad Borchling (Hamburg Germanist), Bruno Borowski (Leipzig Anglicist), Wilhelm Böttger (Leipzig chemist), Kurt Brand (Marburg pharmacist), Erich Brandenburg (Leipzig historian), Wilhelm Braeucker (Hamburg surgeon), Gustav Brandes (Dresden zoologist), Ludolph Brauer (Hamburg aviation medicine specialist), Friedrich Braun (Leipzig Germanist), Hermann Braune (Hannover chemist), Erich Bräunlich (Leipzig orientalist), Gustav Bredemann (Hamburg agronomist), Hellmut Bredereck (Leipzig chemist), Franz Brenthel (Freiberg metallurgist), Roland Brinkmann (Hamburger geographer), Georg Brion (1873–1950, Freiberg), Joachim Brock (Marburg pediatrician), Johannes Brodersen (Hamburg anatomist), Ernst Broermann (Bonn psychologist), Paul Brohmer (Kiel biologist), Leo Bruhns (Leipzig art historian), Otto Brunck (Freiberg chemist), Curt Brunst (Dresden), Eberhard Buchwald (Danziger physicist), Günther Budelmann, Alfred Burgardsmeier (Bonner Kirchenhistoriker), Felix Burkhardt (Leipzig statistician), Otto Burmeister (Rostock teacher), Werner Burmeister (Hamburg art-historian), Adolf Busemann (Dresden aeronatician), Adolf Butenandt (Danzig Chemist and later Nobel prize winner)

=== C–D ===
Hans Freiherr von Campenhausen (Göttingen theologian), Ernst Carlsohn (Leipzig chemist), Wilhelm Cauer (Göttingen mathematician), Peter Claussen (Marburg botanist), Paul Cohrs (Leipzig veterinarian), Hermann Cranz (Mechanical engineer, Hannover), Nikolaus Creutzburg (Geographer, Danzig), Rudolf Criegee (Marburg chemist), Adolf Dabelow (Marburg physician), Hans Dachs (Regensburg), Petrus Dausch (Theologian), Rudolf Degkwitz (senior) (Hamburg physician), Friedrich Delekat (Dresden theologian), Alfred Dengler (Eberswald forester), Georg Dettmar (Hannover technician), Gustaf Deuchler (Hamburg teacher), Paul Deutsch (Leipzig economist), Max Deutschbein (Marburg Anglicist), Hans Diller (Hamburg philologist), Rudolf Dittler (Marburg ophthalmologist), Ottmar Dittrich (Leipzig linguist), Walter Döpp (Marburg botanist), Hans Dörries (Göttingen geographer), Carl Dolezalek (Civil engineer, Hannover), Heinz Dotterweich (Dresden zoologist), Friedrich Drenckhahn (Rostock teacher), Johannes von den Driesch (Bonn teacher), Karlfried Graf Dürckheim (Kiel psychologist), Herbert W. Duda (Leipzig Orientalist), Gerhard Duters

=== E ===
August Eber (Leipzig veterinarian), Margarete Eberhardt (Hamburg teacher), Adolf Eberle (Moral theologian), Georg von Ebert (Nürnberg), Friedrich August Ebrard (Hamburg law historian), Heinrich Eddelbüttel (Rostock biologist), Richard Egenter (Theologian), Rudolf Ehrenberg (Göttingen biologist), Walter Ehrenstein (Danzig psychologist), Hermann August Eidmann (Hannoversch Münden, entomologist), Karl Eimer (Marburg physician, Otto Eiselin (Danzig architect), Ludwig Eisenhofer (Eichstätt theologian), Curt Eisfeld (Hamburg administrator), Ernst Elster (Marburg Germanist), Otto Emicke (Freiberg mineralogist), Josef Engert (Regensburg philosopher), Willi Enke (Marburg psychiatrist), Wilhelm Ernst (Hamburg), Ben Esser (Bonn music teacher), Erich Everth (Leipzig publicist)

=== F ===
Theodor Fahr (Hamburg pathologist), Rudolf Fahrner (Marburg Germanist), Ferdinand Fehling (Lübeck-Hamburger historian), Karl Feist (Göttinger pharmacist), Friedrich Feld (Berlin), Rainer Fetscher (Dresden geneticist), Fritz Fichtner (Dresden art historian), Paul Ficker (Dresden teacher), Otto Fiederling (Hannover architect), Carl August Fischer (Hamburg), Eugen Fischer (physician), Friedrich Fischer (TH Hannover), Otto Flachsbart (Technician TU Hannover), Ulrich Fleck (Göttingen neurologist), Hans Fliege (Marburg dentist), Wilhelm Flitner (Hamburg teacher), Karl Florenz (Hamburg Japanologist), Gustav Flügel (Danzig), Johann Ulrich Folkers (Rostock historian), Alfred Forke (Hamburg Sinologist), Günther Franz (Marburg historian), Otto Franzius (Civil engineer, Hannover), Hans Freese (Dresden architect), Julius Fressel (Hamburg gynaecologist), Joseph Freundorfer (Bishop of Augsburg), Hans Freyer (Leipzig sociologist), Walter Freytag (Hamburg), Ernst Friedrich (Leipzig geographer), Johannes Friedrich (Leipzig Rector), Theodor Frings (Leipzig Germanist), Otto Emil Fritzsche (Freiberg engineer), Gotthold Frotscher (Danzig musicologist), Hugo Fuchs (Göttingen anatomist), Vinzenz Fuchs (theologian), Erwin Fues (Hannover physicist)

=== G ===
Hans-Georg Gadamer (Marburg philosopher), Kurt Gaede (Hannover civil engineer), Paul Gast (Hannover geographer), Julius Gebhard (Hamburg teacher), Arnold Gehlen (Leipzig sociologist), Willy Gehler (Dresden civil engineer), Hans Gehrig (Dresden), Oscar Gehrig (Rostock art historian), Karl August Geiger (moralist), Otto Geißler (Hannover), Wilhelm Geißler (Dresden civil engineer), Felix Genzmer (Marburg), Herbert Gerdessen (1892– , Rostock), Ernst Gehrhardt (forest researcher), Hans Geyr von Schweppenburg (forest researcher), Gustav Giemsa (Hamburg chemist), Wilhelm Giese (Hamburg), Josef Giesen (Bonn art historian), Otto Glauning (Leipzig), Engelhardt Glimm (Danzig chemist), Hermann Gmelin (Danzig romanist), Otto Goebel (Hannover), Kurt Göcke (Dresden orthopaedist), August Götte (Clausthal geologist), Arthur Golf (Leipzig), Fritz Goos (Hamburg physicist), Hugo Grau (Leipzig veterinarian), Georg Grimpe (Leipzig zoologist), Waldemar Grix (Danzig electronics engineer), Franz Groebbels (Hamburg physician), Walter Große (Leipzig economist), H. Großmann (Göttingen geneticist), Hermann Großmann (Leipzig economist), Rudolf Grossmann (Romanist) (Hamburg), Eduard Grüneisen (Marburg physicist), Georg Wilhelm Grüter (Marburg ophthalmologist), Herbert Grundmann (Leipzig historian), Georg Grunwald (Regensburg theologian), Adolf Güntherschulze (Dresden physicist)

=== H ===
Rudolf Habermann (1884–1941, Hamburg dermatologist), Fedor Haenisch (Hamburg radiologist), Reinhard Haferkorn (Danzig Anglicist), Konstantin von Haffner (Hamburg zoologist), Jörgen Hansen (Kiel geographer), Karl Hansen (Hamburg teacher), Richard Hanssen (Hamburg ophthalmologist), Richard Harder (Göttingen), Helmut Hasse (Marburg mathematician), Kurt Hassert (Dresden geographer), Edwin Hauberrisser (Göttingen dentist), Herbert Haupt (Leipzig veterinarian), Johann Nepomuk Hebensperger (historian), Erich Hecke (Hamburg mathematician), Otto Heckmann (Göttingen astronomer), Enno Heidebroek (Dresden engineer), Martin Heidegger (philosopher), Robert Heidenreich (Leipzig archaeologist), Georg Heidingsfelder (Eichstätt theologian), Alfred Heiduschka (Dresden food chemist), Willi Heike (1880–1944, Freiberg metallurgist), Franz Hein (Leipzig), Wilhelm Heinitz (Hamburg musicologist), Rudolf Heinz (Hamburg), Heinrich Heiser (Dresden engineer), Emil Heitz (Hamburg), Sven Helander (economist), Gustav Heller (Leipzig chemist), Karl Helm (Marburg Germanist), Eberhard Hempel (Dresden art historian), Johannes Hempel (Göttingen theologian), Friedrich Hempelmann (Leipzig zoologist), Ernst Hentschel (Hamburg zoologist), Eduard Hermann (Göttingen linguist), Ernst Hertel (Leipzig ophthalmologist), Johannes Hertel (Leipzig Indologist), Julius Herweg (Hannover physicist), Alois Herzog (Dresden textile engineer), Franz Heske (Dresden forester), Herbert Hesmer (Eberswald forester), Paul Hesse (Göttingen agronomist), Theodor Hetzer (Leipzig art historian), Max Heuwieser (church historian), Johannes Erich Heyde (Rostock philosopher), Theodor Heynemann (Hamburg gynaecologist), Emil Hilarius (Dresden teacher), Heinrich Hildebrand (Marburg), Leo von Hibler (Anglicist in Leipzig and Dresden), Emanuel Hirsch (Göttingen theologian), Alexander Höfer (Dresden sculptor), Emil Högg (Dresden architect), Otto Hölder (Leipzig mathematician), Cornelius Hölk (Marburg teacher), Robert Höltje (Danzig chemist), Alexander Hoffmann (Leipzig administrator), Hans Hoffmann (Hamburg), Walter Hoffmann (Freiberg), Albert von Hofmann (Marburg historian), Erich Hofmann (Göttingen linguist), Johannes Hofmann (librarian, Leipzig), Paul Hofmann(Dresden), Gustav Hopf (Hamburg dermatologist), Carl Horst (Marburg art historian), Joseph Anton Huber (Dillingen), Alfred Hübner (Göttingen Germanist), Valerius Hüttig (Dresden aircraft engineer), Reinhard Hugershoff (Dresden geodesist), Karl Humburg (Hannover technician)

=== I–J ===
Edgar Irmscher (Hamburg botanist), Otto Israel-Oesterhelt (Dresden geodesist), Bernhard Iversen (Kiel music teacher), Arnold Jacobi (Dresden zoologist), Eduard Jacobshagen (Marburg anatomist), Peter Jaeck (Marburg sports researcher), Fritz Jäger (Hamburg sinologist), Erich Jaensch (Marburg psychologist), Walther Jaensch (Berlin sports medicine), Eduard Jahn (botanist), Maximilian Jahrmärker (Marburg psychologist), Eduard von Jan (Leipzig Romanist), Christian Janentzky (Dresden Germanist), Heinz Janert (Leipzig soil scienst), Harro de Wet Jensen (Marburg Anglicist), Christian Jensen (Hamburg physicist), Peter Jensen (Marburg Hittitologist), Gerhard de Jonge (Danzig engineer), Wilhelm Hermann Jost (Dresden architect), Erich Jung (Marburg law expert), Heinrich Junker (Leipzig linguist), Hubert Junker (theologian)

=== K ===
Felix Kämpf (Leipzig physicist), Alfred Kaestner (Dresden zoologist), Alfred Kalähne (Danzig physicist), Paul Kanold (Hannover architect), Helmuth Kanter (Hamburg geographer), Oskar Fritz Karg (Leipzig Germanist), August Karolus (Leipzig physicist), Walter Kayser (Berlin sports researcher), Eduard Keeser (Hamburg pharmacologist), Karl Kegel (Freiberg mining engineer), Erwin Kehrer (1874–1959, Marburg gynaecologist), Egon Keining (Hamburg dermatologist), Gustav Keppeler (Hannover chemist), Otto Kestner (Hamburg physician), Karl Kiefer (Eichstätt theologian), Hans Kienle (Göttingen astronomer), Sebastian Killermann (PTH Regensburg, theologian), Heinz Kindermann (Danzig), Karl Kindler (Hamburg pharmacologist), Paul Kirn (Leipzig historian), Walter Rudolf Kirschbaum (Hamburg neurologist), Otto Kirschmer (Dresden physicist), Julius Kister (Hamburg bacteriologist), Rudolf Klapp (Marburg surgeon), Heinrich Klebahn (Hamburg mycologist), Johannes Klein (Marburg), Ludwig Klein (Hannover machine maker), Otto Klemm (Leipzig psychologist), Wilhelm Klemm (Danzig), Felix Klewitz (Marburg physician), Martin Klimmer (Leipzig veterinarian), Erich Klinge (Berlin-Charlottenburg), August Klingenheben (Hamburg Africanist), Friedrich Klingner (Leipzig philologist), Otto Kloeppel (Danzig architect), August Klughardt (1887–1970, Dresden optician), Friedrich Knauer (Hamburg), Alfred Kneschke (Dresden mathematician), Hans Otto Kneser (Marburg physicist), Werner Kniehahn (Dresden machine maker), Hugo Wilhelm Knipping (Hamburg Internist), Wilhelm Knoll (Hamburg sports medicine specialist), Emil Koch (Hamburg geographer), Peter Paul Koch (Hamburg physicist), Carl Walter Kockel (Leipzig geologist), Paul Koebe (Leipzig mathematician), Franz Kögler (Freiberg civil engineer), Walter König (Dresden), Max Koernicke (Bonn agronomist), Alfred Körte (Leipzig philologist), Rudolf Kötzschke (Leipzig historian), Friedrich Kolbeck (Freiberg geologist), Willy Kolz (Rostock teacher), Harald Koschmieder (Danzig meteorologist), Walter Kossel (Danzig physicist), Franz Kossmat (Leipzig geologist), Gerhard Kowalewski (Dresden mathematician), Maximilian Krafft (Marburg mathematician), Werner Krauss (Romanist) (Marburg), Erich Krenkel (Leipzig geologist), Ernst Kretschmer (Marburg psychiatrist), Julius Krieg (Regensburg theologian), Martin Kröger (Leipzig chemist), Felix Krueger (Leipzig psychologist), Fritz Krüger (Romanist) (Hamburg), Gerhard Krüger (Marburg), Friedrich Küch (Marburg archivist), Karl Küpfmüller (Danzig electrotechnician), Hermann Kümmell (Hamburg surgeon), Josef Kürzinger (Eichstätt theologian), Hans Kuhn (Marburger Germanist), Friedrich Kutscher (Marburg), Karl Kutzbach (Dresden machinist)

=== L ===
Max Otto Lagally (Dresden mathematician), Albrecht Langelüddeke (Hamburg psychiatrist), Otto Lauffer (Hamburg folklorist), Fritz Laves (Göttingen mineralogist), Joseph Lechner (Eichstätt canon), Kurt Leese (Hamburg philosopher), Bruno Lehmann (Dresden), Max Rudolf Lehmann (Nürnberg economist), Rudolf Lehmann (Leipzig ethnologist), Walther Lehmann (Hamburg), Erich Lehmensick (Kiel teacher), Hans Lemmel (Eberswalde), Wilhelm Lenz (Hamburg physicist), Philipp Lersch (Leipzig psychologist), E. H. Lieber, Otto Lienau (Danzig ship builder), Paul Lindemann (Hamburg), Joseph Lippl (Regensburg Old Testament scholar), Hans Lipps (Marburg philosopher), Friedrich Lipsius (philosopher), Theodor Litt (philosopher), Helmut Loebell (Marburg physician), Ernst Lommatzsch (Marburg philologist), Hans Lorenz (Danzig engineer), Alexander Lorey (Hamburg radiologist), Alfred Lottermoser (Dresden chemist), Heinrich Lottig (Hamburg physiologist), Rudolf Lütgens (Hamburg geographer), Robert Luther (Dresden)

=== M ===
Gerhard Mackenroth (Marburg jurist), Johannes Madel (Freiberg geologist), Dietrich Mahnke (Marburg philosopher), Erich Manegold (Göttingen chemist), Johann Wilhelm Mannhardt (Folklorist), Otto Mattes (Marburg zoologist), Eduard Maurer (Freiberg metallurgist), Friedrich Mauz (Marburg psychiatrist), Kurt May (Göttingen Germanist), Martin Mayer (Hamburg physician), Franz Xaver Mayr (Eichstätt), Hans Mayer-Wegelin (Hannoversch Münder forest researcher), Harry Maync (Marburg Germanist), Rudolf Meerwarth (Leipzig statistician), Hans Meerwein (Marburg chemist), Carl Meinhof (Hamburg Africanist), Edwin Meister (Dresden textile engineer), Konrad Mellerowicz (Berlin economist), Gerhard Menz (Leipzig economist), Heinrich Menzel (Dresden chemist), Eugen von Mercklin (Hamburg archaeologist), Walther Merk (Marburg jurist), Adolf Meyer (Hamburg biologist), Hans Meyer (Hamburg), Heinrich Meyer-Benfey (Hamburg Germanist), Adolf Meyn (Leipzig veterinarian), Fritz Micheel (Göttingen chemist), Eugen Michel (Hannover architect), Heinrich von Minnigerode (Marburg jurist), Hermann Mirbt (Göttingen jurist), Waldemar Mitscherlich (Göttingen political scientist), Max Mitterer (Passau theologian), Walther Mitzka (Marburg linguist), Willy Möbius (Leipzig physicist), Hans Georg Möller (Hamburg), Eugen Mogk (Leipzig Nordist), Bruno Moll (Leipzig economist), Wilhelm Mommsen (Marburg historian), Max Momsen (Kiel teacher), Lorenz Morsbach (Göttingen Anglicist), Adolf Muesmann (Dresden architect), Peter Mühlens (Hamburg public health), Conrad Müller (Hannover mathematician), Erich Müller (Chemist), Friedrich Müller (Dresden), Kurt Müller (Göttingen), Wilhelm Müller-Lenhartz (Leipzig agronomist), Paul Mulzer (Hamburg dermatologist), Karl Mylius (Hamburg)

=== N ===
Alwin Nachtweh (Hannover engineer), Adolph Nägel (Dresden engineer), Emil Naetsch (Dresden mathematician), Ernst Georg Nauck (Hamburg physician), Hans Naujoks (Marburg gynaecologist), Friedrich Neesen (Danzig civil engineer), Walter Nehm (Clausthal mine surveyor), Harald Nehrkorn (Hamburg mathematician), Friedrich Wilhelm Neuffer (Dresden civil engineer), Willy Neuling (Hamburg economist), Ernst Richard Neumann (Marburg mathematician), Friedrich Neumann (Germanist) (Göttingen), Johannes Neumann (Hamburg veterinarian), Kurt Neumann (Hannover engineer), Rudolf Otto Neumann (Hamburg bacteriologist), Karl Nieberle (Leipzig veterinarian), Arthur Philipp Nikisch (Dresden jurist), Hermann Noack (Hamburg), Johannes Nobel (Marburg Indologist), Bernhard Nocht (Hamburg tropical medicine specialist), Max Nordhausen (Marburg botanist)

=== O–P ===
Karl Justus Obenauer (Leipzig Germanist), Erich Obst (Hannover geographer), Franz Oehlecker (Hamburg haematologist), Julius Oelkers (Hannoversch Münder forest researcher), Fritz Oesterlen (Hannover engineer), Wolfgang Ostwald (Leipzig chemist), Max Pagenstecher (Hamburg jurist, Georg Pallaske (Leipzig veterinarian), Giulio Panconcelli-Calzia (Hamburg phonetician), Erwin Papperitz (Freiberg mathematician), Erich Parnitzke (Kiel art teacher), Enrique Paschen (Hamburg physician), Siegfried Passarge (Hamburg geographer and folklorist), Walther Pauer (Dresden energy researcher), Gustav Pauli (Hamburg art historian), Friedrich Peemöller (Hamburg physician), Balduin Penndorf (Leipzig economist), Hans Pesta (Hamburg teacher), Rudolf Peter (Hamburg teacher), Ulrich Peters (Kiel rector), Richard Petersen (Danzig engineer), Hans Petersson (Hamburg mathematician), Robert Petsch (Hamburg Germanist), Heinrich Pette (Hamburg neurologist), Wilhelm Pfannenstiel (Marburg eugenicist), Georg Pfeilschifter (München church historian), Kurt Pietzsch (Leipzig geologist), Wilhelm Pinder (München art historian), Hans Plischke (Göttingen ethnologist), Ernst Pohlhausen (Danzig mathematician), Hermann Potthoff (Hannover engineer), Georg Prange (Hannover mathematician), Julius Precht (Hannover physicist), Heinrich Prell (Dresden forester), Anton von Premerstein (Marburg historian), Edgar Pröbster (Leipzig orientalist), Arthur Pröll (Hannover aircraft engineer), Arthur Prüfer (Leipzig musicologist)

=== R ===
Paul Rabe (Hamburg), Michael Rackl (Eichstätt theologian), Georg Raederscheidt (Director of the Bonn academy of pedagogy), Berthold Rassow (Leipzig chemist), Fritz Rauda (Dresden architect), Hans Rebel (Göttingen dentist), Otto Reche (Leipzig anthropologist), Joachim von Reckow (Marburg dentist), Konstantin Reichardt (Leipzig Nordist), Eduard Reichenow (Hamburg biologist), Ferdinand Reiff (Marburg chemist), Adolf Rein (Hamburg historian), Hermann Rein (Göttingen physician), Richard Reinhardt (Leipzig veterinarian), Richard Reisig (Leipzig teacher), Viktor Rembold (Danzig ship builder), Heinrich Remy (Hamburg chemist), Theodor Remy (Bonn forester), Oscar Reuther (Dresden archaeologist), Johannes Max Hugo Richter (Leipzig), Paul Riebesell (Hamburg actuary), Wilhelm Rieder (Hamburg surgeon), August Rippel (Göttingen microbiologist), Curt Risch (Hannover railway engineer), Eberhard Rimann (Dresden geologist), Curt Risch (Hannover civil engineer), Joachim Ritter (Hamburg philosopher), Erich Rix (Marburg pathologist), Ernst Roedelius (Hamburg surgeon), Karl Röder (Hannover engineer), Fritz Rössel (Hamburg physician), Georg Rohde (Marburg philologist), Hermann Rose (Hamburg geologist), Heinrich Roth (Elektrotechnician) (Danzig, 1880–1945), Konrad Rubner (Dresden forester), Hans Rudolphi (Leipzig geographer), Georg Rüth (Dresden engineer), Alfred Ruete (Marburg dermatologist), Wilhelm Ruhland (Leipzig botanist), Max Rumpf (Nürnberg sociologist), Hermann Gustav Runge (Hamburg physician)

=== Sa–Sch ===
Ewald Sachsenberg (Dresden academic administrator), Horst von Sanden (Hannover mathematician), Curt Sandig (Leipzig economist), Heinrich Sauer (Hamburg), Ferdinand Sauerbruch (Berlin physician), Erich Schäfer (Nürnberg economist), Karl Theodor Schäfer (Regensburg theologian), Wilhelm Schäperclaus (Eberswald zoologist), Carl Schall (Leipzig chemist), Georg Schaltenbrand (Hamburg neurologist), Johannes Scheffler (Dresden), Johannes Scheiber (Leipzig chemist), Walter Scheidt (Hamburg eugenicist), Georg Scheller (Nürnberg), Martin Schenck (Leipzig chemist), Harald Schering (Hannover technician), Siegmund Schermer (Göttingen veterinarian), Karl-Hermann Scheumann (Leipzig geologist), Carl Arthur Scheunert (Leipzig veterinarian), Eberhard Freiherr von Scheurl (Nürnberg jurist), Martin Schieblich (Leipzig veterinarian), Ernst Schiebold (Leipzig mineralogist), Carl Schiffner (Freiberg metallurgist), Ludwig Schiller (Leipzig physicist), Bernhard Schilling (Dresden mathematician), Friedrich Schilling (Danzig mathematician), Werner Schingnitz (Leipzig philosopher), Arthur Schleede (Leipzig chemist), Carl Schlieper (Marburg zoologist), Josef Schmid (Dillingen theologian), Ernst Schmidt (Danzig physicist), Harry Schmidt (Leipzig chemist), Johannes Schmidt (Leipzig veterinarian), Jonas Schmidt (Göttingen zoologist), Werner Schmidt (Eberswalde forest researcher), Wolfgang Schmidt-Hidding (Marburg Anglicist), G. Schmitthenner, Eugen Schmitz (Dresden musicologist), Leonhard Schmöller (Passau theologian), Friedrich Schneider (Bonn), Hermann Schneider (Leipzig philosopher), Paul Schneider (Hamburg), Wilhelm Schneider-Windmüller (Bonn), Franz Schob (Dresden psychologist), Roland Scholl (Dresden), Richard Scholz (Leipzig historian), Richard Schorr (Hamburg astronomer), Gerhard Schott (Hamburg oceanographer), Hugo Schottmüller (Hamburg bacteriologist), Friedrich Schreiber (Dresden), Alfred Schröder (Dillingen theologian), Bruno Schröder (Dresden archaeologist), Edward Schröder (Göttingen Germanist), Joseph Schröffer (Eichstätt theologian), Paul Schubring (Hannover art historian), Walther Schubring (Hamburg Indologist), Levin Ludwig Schücking (Leipzig Anglicist), Alfred Schüz (Hamburg historian), Hans Schulten (Hamburg internist), Bruno Schultz (Dresden economist), Helmut Schultz (Leipzig, musicologist), Ernst Schultze (Leipzig), Walter Schultze (Hamburg teacher), Leonhard Schultze-Jena (Marburg zoologist), Otto Theodor Schulz (Leipzig historian), Alfred Schulze (Marburg Romanist), Franz Arthur Schulze (Marburg physicist), Otto Schulze (Danzig), Gerhard Schulze-Pillot (Danzig engineer), Paul Schulz-Kiesow (Hamburg researcher), Rudolf Schulz-Schaeffer (Marburg jurist), Friedrich Schumacher (Geologist, Freiberg), Otto Schumm (Hamburg chemist), Kurt Schwabe (Dresden chemist), Carl Leopold Schwarz (Hamburg public health specialist), Paul Schwarz (Leipzig Orientalist), Bernhard Schweitzer (Leipzig archaeologist), Alfred Schwenkenbecher (Marburg Internist), Friedrich Schwerd (Hannover engineer), Wilhelm Schwinning (Dresden metallurgist)

=== Se-Sz ===
Wilhelm Seedorf (Göttingen agroeconomist), Walter Seiz (Danzig engineer), Emil Sieg (Göttingen Indo-Germanist), Arthur Simon (Dresden chemist), Aladar Skita (Hannover chemist), Alexander Snyckers (Belgian linguist), Emil Sörensen (Dresden engineer), Max Graf zu Solms (Marburg sociologist), Julius Sommer (Danzig mathematician), Curt Sonnenschein (Hamburg tropical medicine specialist), Adolf Spamer (Dresden Germanist), Curt Sprehn (Leipzig veterinarian), Paul Ssymank (Göttingen historian), Franz Stadtmüller (Göttingen anatomist), Martin Stammer (Rostock theologian), Otto Hermann Steche (Leipzig zoologist), Kurt Steinbart (Marburg art historian), Martha Steinert (Kiel teacher), Wilhelm Steinkopf (Dresden chemist), Edmund E. Stengel (Marburg historian), Hermann Stephani (Marburg musicologist), Johannes Evangelist Stigler (Eichstätt mathematician), Hans Stobbe (Leipzig chemist), Karl Stöckl (Regensburg physicist), Rose Stoppel (Hamburg botanist), Werner Straub (Dresden psychologist), Reinhard Strecker (Eberswald), Wilhelm Strecker (Marburg chemist), Rudolf Streller (Leipzig economist), Hermann Stremme (Danzig soil scientist), Bernhard Struck (Dresden folklorist), Fritz Stückrath (Hamburg teacher), Otto Stutzer (Freiberg geologist), Paul Sudeck (Hamburg surgeon), Heinrich Süchting (Hannoversch Münden soil scientist), Karl Süpfle (Dresden public health expert), Heinrich Sulze (Dresden civil engineer), Karl Friedrich Suter (Leipzig art historian)

=== T–U ===
Ernst Tams (Hamburg geophysicist), Jehangir S. Tevadia (Hamburg Indologist), Horst Teichmann (Dresden physicist), Fritz Terhalle (Hamburg economist), Adolf Teuscher (Dresden teacher), Karl Thalheim (Leipzig economist), Alfred Thiel (Marburg chemist), Hermann Thiersch (Göttingen archaeologist), Georg Thilenius (Hamburg folklorist), Arthur Thost (Hamburg physician), William Threlfall (British Mathematician in Dresden), Friedrich Tobler (Dresdnen botanist), Maximilian Toepler (Dresden physicist), Rudolf Tomaschek (Marburg physicist), Reinhold Trautmann (Leipzig Slavist), Erich Trefftz (Dresden mathematician), Emil Treptow (Freiberg mining engineer), Karl Tripp (Marburg biologist), Walter Ehrenreich Tröger (Dresden mineralogist), Carl von Tyszka (Hamburg economist), Hans Ueberschaar (Leipzig Japanologist), Jakob Johann von Uexküll (Hamburg environmental researcher), Walther Uffenorde (Marburg physician), Wolfgang Heinz Uhlitzsch (Freiberg), Egon Ullrich (Marburg Mathematician), Hermann Ullrich (Leipzig botanist), Adalbert von Unruh (Göttingen jurist)

=== V ===
Siegfried Valentiner (Clausthal physicist), Max Versé (Marburg physician), Wilhelm Vershofen (Economist), Wilhelm Ernst Vetter (Dresden theologian), Ernst Vetterlein (Hannover architect), Hermann Vogel (Göttingen agronomist), Paul Vogel (1877–1960; Leipzig teacher), Richard Vogel (Dresden), Rudolf Vogel (Göttingen physicist), Sebastian Vogl (Passau historian), Eckhardt Vogt (Marburg physicist), Walter Voigtländer (Dresden teacher), Hans Volkelt (Leipzig psychologist), Wilhelm Volz (Leipzig geographer), Friedrich Voß (Göttingen entomologist), Otto Voss (Hamburg neurosurgeon)

=== W ===
Friedrich Wachtsmuth (Marburg art historian), Kurt Wagner (Marburg Germanist), Friedrich August Wahl (Marburg gynaecologist), Gustav Wahl (Hamburg librarian), Bernhard Walde (Dillingen theologian), Michael Waldmann (Regensburg theologian), Andreas Walther (Hamburg sociologist), Paul Erich Wandhoff (Freiberg geographer), Otto Wawrziniok (Dresden metallurgist), Anton Weber (Dillingen), Constantin Weber (Dresden mechanic), Ewald Weber (Leipzig veterinarian), Hermann Robert Weber (Danzig zoologist), Werner Weber (Göttingen mathematician), Edgar Wedekind (Hannoversch Münden chemist), Rudolf Wedekind (Marburg palaeontologist), Emil Wehrle (Marburg jurist), Ludwig Weickmann (Leipzig geophysicist), Walther Weigelt (Freiberg), Walter Weigmann (Leipzig economist), Karl Friedrich Weimann (Leipzig historian), Paul Weinrowsky (Kiel physicist), Franz Heinrich Weißbach (Leipzig Orientalist), Friedrich Weller (Leipzig Indologe), Hermann Wendorf (Leipzig historian), Ferdinand von Werden (Eichstätt art historian), Paul Werkmeister (Dresden engineer), Otto Westphal (Hamburg historian), Wilhelm Weygandt (Hamburg psychiatrist), Georg Wiarda (Dresden mathematician), Paul Wichmann (Hamburg dermatologist), Walter Wickop (Hannover architect), Eilhard Wiedemann (Eberswald), Kurt Wiedenfeld (Leipzig economist), Gebhardt Wiedmann (Dresden physicist), Heinrich Wienhaus (Göttingen chemist), Friedrich Adolf Willers (Freiberg mathematician), Hans Winkler (Hamburg botanist), Hugo Wippler (Leipzig artist), Wilhelm Wirth (Leipzig philosopher), Hans Adolf Wislicenus (Dresden forester), Karl Wittmaack (Hamburg physician), Michael Wittmann (Eichstätt), Georg Wobbermin (Göttingen theologian), Gerhard Wörner (Leipzig jurist), Georg Wohlmuth (Eichstätt philosopher), Walther Wolf (Leipzig Egyptologist), Ludwig Wolff (Göttingen Germanist), Max Wolff (Eberswald zoologist), Richard Woltereck (Leipzig zoologist), Ferdinand Wrede (Marburg linguist), Heinz-Georg Wünscher (Leipzig veterinarian), Feodor Wünschmann (Leipzig economist), Heinz Wulf (Hamburg physician), Wunniger, Franz Wutz (Eichstädt theologian), Johann Wysogorski (Hamburg geologist)

=== Z ===
Eduard Zarncke (Leipzig philologist), Rudolph Zaunick (Dresden librarian), Oskar Zdralek (Dresden engineer), Egmont Zechlin (Marburg historian), Paul Zenetti (Dillingen geologist), Peter Zepp (Bonn geographer), Erich Ziebarth (Hamburg historian), Hans-Willi Ziegler (Rostock psychologist), Ludwig Zimmermann (Marburg historian), Waldemar Zimmermann (Hamburg), Friedrich Zoepfl (Dillingen church historian), Ernst Zyhlarz (Hamburg Africanist)

== See also ==
- 2022 address of the Russian Union of Rectors
- Manifesto of the Ninety-Three (1914)
- Martin Heidegger and Nazism
