= Gotthold Frotscher =

German music historian and musicologist

Gotthold Frotscher (6 December 1897 – 30 September 1967) was a German music historian and musicologist.

== Life ==
Born in Ossa (Geithain), Frotscher was the son of Oberkirchenrat Dr. Paul G. Frotscher and his wife Ida H. Berger. Frotscher finished his schooling at the humanistic grammar school in Freiberg in 1916 as Primus Omnium. He then began to study mainly musicology, German and philosophy at the University of Leipzig and the Rheinische Friedrich-Wilhelms-Universität Bonn. His professors included Hermann Abert, Albert Köster, Felix Krueger, Hugo Riemann, Arnold Schering, Eduard Spranger and Wilhelm Wundt.

With effect from 28 March 1922, Frotscher was awarded a doctorate by the University of Leipzig his dissertation had the topic The Aesthetics of the Berlin Song in the 18th Century. Already during his studies he was a freelance contributor to the Leipziger Abendpost and the Neue Musikzeitung.

This was followed in 1920 by the founding of an academic orchestra association in Leipzig and a state examination in music theory and organ playing in Dresden in 1922. Many historical concerts in Leipzig and concert tours through Saxony to cultivate early music were undertaken with the academic orchestra. On 22 May 1923 Frotscher married Gertrud Luise Heinrichsdorff, a daughter of Otto Heinrichsdorff. With her he had two sons, Arnold and Johann Christian.

From 1923 to 1934, Frotscher taught at the Technische Hochschule Danzig. There, he completed his Habilitation in 1924 on Die Hauptprobleme der Musikästhetik des 18. Jahrhunderts (apparently unpublished to this day).

After the Machtergreifung by the Nazis, Frotscher joined the NSDAP on 1 May 1933. In November 1933, he signed the Vow of allegiance of the Professors of the German Universities and High-Schools to Adolf Hitler and the National Socialistic State. He worked as a subject group leader in the field of music in the Militant League for German Culture (KfdK) Danzig. In 1935, he was a staff member and advisor to the main music department in the cultural office of the Reichsjugendführung and head of its organ working group.

In 1936 he was appointed to the Humboldt University of Berlin and from 1939 he worked for the State Institute for Music Research, where he devoted himself to racial research with regard to German musical culture, published various racist elaborations on the subject of "music and race" and gave speeches at Nazi events. He was an advisor to the Reich Ministry of Public Enlightenment and Propaganda. In addition to his "racial research", he carried out organological research. There are numerous publications by Frotscher on the history of organ playing. On behalf of the Reichsjugendführung, he edited the journal Musik in Jugend und Volk.

After the end of the Second World War, he held a lectureship in musicology at the Pädagogische Hochschule Berlin from 1950. From 1965 onwards, Frotscher wrote as a freelancer for the music magazines Hi-Fi and Fono Forum.

Frotscher died in Berlin at the age of 69.

== Publications ==
Books

- Die Orgel (Webers illustrierte Handbücher). Weber, Leipzig 1927.
- Geschichte des Orgespiels und der Orgelkomposition. 2 volumes. Berlin 1935/1936 (Nachdruck: Merseburger, Kassel 1978, ISBN 978-3-87537-015-7).
- Johann Sebastian Bach und die Musik des 17. Jahrhunderts. Vortrag. Villiger, Wädenswil 1939.
- Goethe und das deutsche Lied. Vortrag. Villiger, Wädenswil 1941.
- Deutsche Orgel-Dispositionen aus fünf Jahrhunderten. Kallmeyer, Wolfenbüttel 1939.
- Aufführungspraxis alter Musik. Ein umfassendes Handbuch über die Musik vergangener Epochen für ihre Interpreten und Liebhaber. Wilhelmshaven 1963 (8th edition Noetzel, Wilhelmshaven 1997, ISBN 978-3-7959-0072-4).

Articles

- Bachs Themenbildung unter dem Einfluss der Affektenlehre. In Bericht über den I. Musikwissenschaftlichen Kongress der Deutschen Musikgesellschaft in Leipzig vom 4. bis 8. Juni 1925. Leipzig 1926, pp. 436–438.
- Zur Registrierkunst des 18. Jahrhunderts. In Wilibald Gurlitt (ed.): Bericht über die Freiburger Tagung für deutsche Orgelkunst vom 27. bis 30. Juli 1926. Kassel 1926, pp. 70–75.
- Zur Problematik der Bach-Orgel. In Bach-Jahrbuch. 1935, pp. 107–121.
- Volksmusik und populare Musik. In Völkische Musikerziehung. Vol. 2 (1936), issue. 1, pp. 481–483.
- Ein Danziger Musikantenspiegel. In Helmuth Osthoff, Walter Serauky, Adam Adrio (ed.): Festschrift Arnold Schering. Berlin 1937, pp. 68–75.
- Rassenstil und Brauchtum. In Völkische Musikkultur. Vol. 3 (1937), pp. 3–10.
- Die Wechselbeziehung zwischen Orgelmusik und Orgelbau in Geschichte und Gegenwart. In Bericht über die zweite Freiburger Tagung für deutsche Orgelkunst. Kassel 1939, pp. 98–103.
- Aufgaben und Ausrichtung der musischen Rasseforschung. In Guido Waldmann (ed.): Rasse und Musik. Berlin 1939, pp. 102–112.
- Ein Jahr Musikarbeit in der Hitlerjugend. In Musik in Jugend und Volk. Vol. 2 (1939), pp. 280–282.
- Volksbräuche und Volkslieder der Deutschen in Polen. In Musik in Jugend und Volk. Vol. 2 (1939), pp. 399–405.
- Die Bedeutung der deutschen Musik im Osten. In Musik in Jugend und Volk. Vol. 4 (1941), pp. 2 f.
- Reichskulturtagung der Hitlerjugend. In Musik in Jugend und Volk. Vol. 4 (1941), pp. 161–167.
- Hitlerjugend musiziert! In Jahrbuch der deutschen Musik. 1943, pp. 59 f.
- G. Frescobaldi. In Deutsche Musikkultur. Vol. 8, issue 5/6, 1943–1944, pp. 80–84.
- Die Aufgabe der Musikwissenschaft. In Wolfgang Stumme (ed.): Musik im Volk. Berlin 1944, pp. 356–368.
- Der Begriff der Volksmusik. In Wolfgang Stumme (ed.): Musik im Volk. Berlin 1944, pp. 368–374.
- Der "Klassiker" Cabanilles. In Analecta musicologica. Vol. 17 (1962), pp. 63–71.

Editions

- Orgelchoräle um Johann Sebastian Bach. Braunschweig 1937.
- Georg Friedrich Händel, Ouvertüre zu Serse, Ouverture for Theodora, Märsche, Tänze und Spielstücke aus Ariodante. Wolfenbüttel 1941–1942.
- Orgelbuch mit Sätzen zu den Feierliedern der Bewegung. 1943.
- Johann Sebastian Bach, 6 Fughetten. Wolfenbüttel 1948.
- Johann Sebastian Bach, 6 Triosonaten, Klavierstücke aus dem III. Teil der Klavier-Übung, 4 Adagios, Aria variata, French and English Suites (Urtext), Violin-Konzert (Rekonstruktion der Kantata 35). Halle 1950–1953.
- Johann Sebastian Bach, 6 Triosonaten nach den Orgelsonaten, eingerichtet für Violine 1 (Flöte/Oboe), Violine 2 (viola), cello, cembalo. Halle 1950.
- Georg Philipp Telemann, 4 Violin-Sonaten. Halle 1953.
