= Eduard Hermann =

Eduard Hermann may refer to

- Eduard Hermann (linguist) (1869–1950), German linguist
- Eduard Hermann (racewalker) (1887–1960), Estonian Olympic racewalker
- Eduard Hermann (wrestler) (1891–1947), Estonian wrestler
