= Emil Julius Gumbel =

German mathematician and political writer

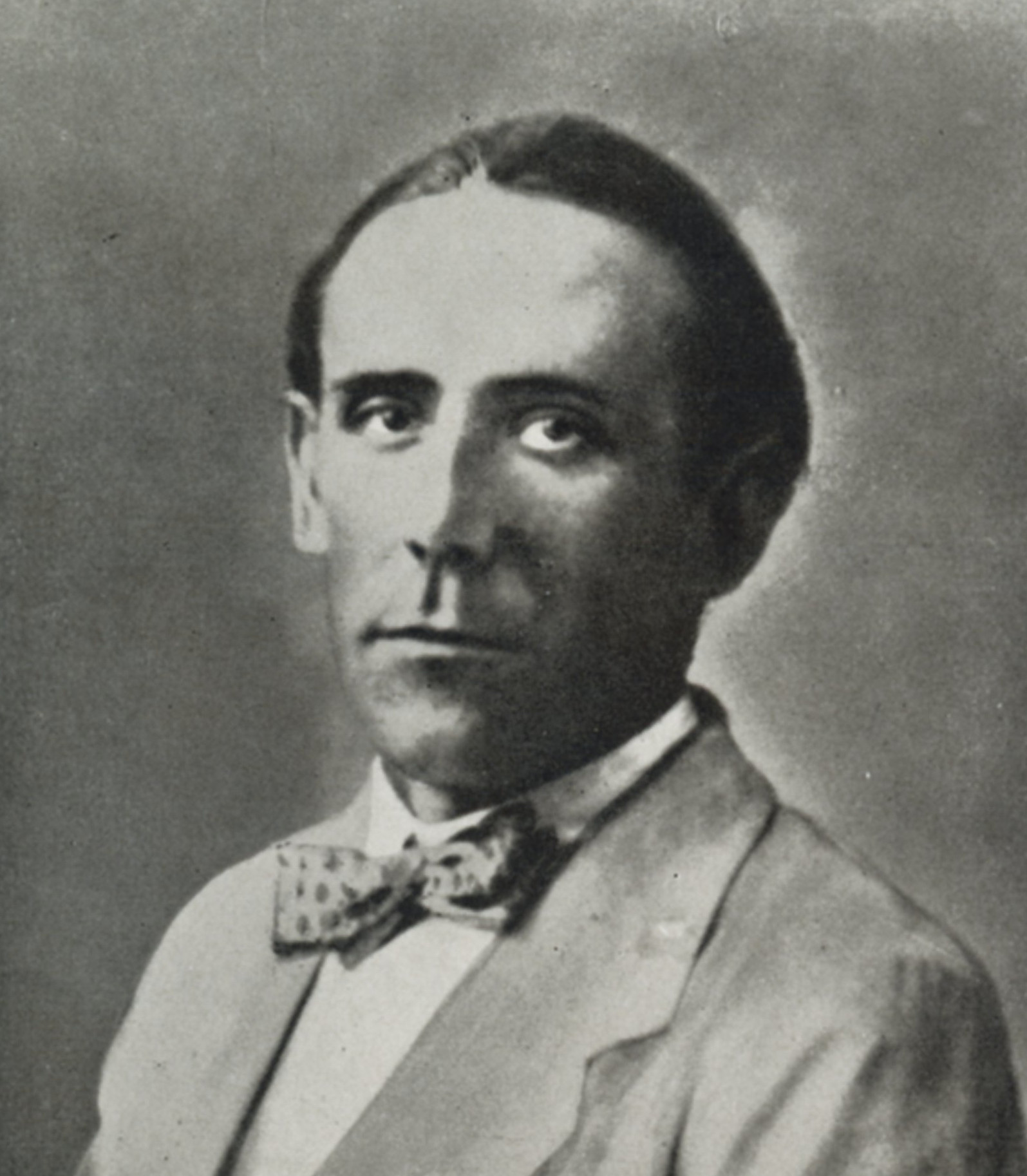
- Gumbel in 1931
- Born: 18 July 1891; Munich, German Empire
- Died: 10 September 1966 (aged 75); New York City, United States
- Education: Ludwig-Maximilians-Universität München
- Known for: Gumbel distribution, Gumbel copula, spurious correlation
- Spouse: Marieluise von Czettritz
- Children: 1 stepson
- Scientific career
- Fields: Statistics, extreme value theory
- Workplaces: Heidelberg University, Institut Henri Poincaré (Paris), Université de Strasbourg, Université de Lyon, École libre des hautes études (New York), New School for Social Research (New York), Brooklyn College (New York), Stanford University (Palo Alto), Columbia University (New York), Free University of Berlin
- Thesis: Über die Interpolation des Bevölkerungsstandes (1914)
- Doctoral advisors: Georg von Mayr, Friedrich Böhm
- Doctoral students: Julian Gumperz

Emil Julius Gumbel (18 July 1891 – 10 September 1966) was a German mathematician and political writer.

Gumbel specialised in mathematical statistics and, along with Leonard Tippett and Ronald Fisher, was instrumental in the development of extreme value theory, which has practical applications in many fields, including engineering and finance. In 1958, Gumbel published a key book, Statistics of Extremes, in which he derived and analyzed the probability distribution that is now known as the Gumbel distribution in his honor.

In the 1920s and early 1930s, Gumbel was considered unusual and highly controversial in German academic circles for his vocal support of left-wing politics and pacifism, and his opposition to Fascism. His influential writings about the politically motivated Feme murders made the case that the Weimar Republic was corruptly anti-leftist and anti-republican. Gumbel publicly opposed the Nazi Party and, in 1932, he was one of the 33 prominent signers of the Urgent Call for Unity.

== Biography ==
Born to a prominent Jewish family in Württemberg, Gumbel graduated in mathematics from the Ludwig-Maximilians-Universität München, completing his doctoral thesis on the topic of population statistics shortly before the outbreak of the First World War. After a short period of military service, he was discharged in 1915 on medical grounds, and he joined the Friedrich Wilhelm University of Berlin to work with the prominent Russian statistician Ladislaus von Bortkiewicz. From this time onwards, he became much more politically active. He joined the Independent Social Democrat Party in 1917, and became a prominent member of the pacifist New Fatherland League which was later renamed the German League for Human Rights. In January 1918, Gumbel took up a position with the electronics company Telefunken, researching sound transmitter waves, and he continued his political activities with the support of one of the firm's founders, Georg Count von Arco, a prominent member of the human rights movement. In 1922, Gumbel became Professor of Mathematical Statistics at Heidelberg University, where he soon found that combining academic work with politics was much more controversial, resulting in protests by students and faculty members, who were mostly right-wing, and strong criticism in the right-wing press.

Among the Nazis' most-hated public intellectuals, the German Minister of Culture revoked his teaching license on August 6, 1932. He was the first German professor to be expelled from the university, nearly a year before his friend Albert Einstein. He then left Heidelberg for Paris, where he had already been lecturing at the Sorbonne since August 1932. After losing his appeal against his dismissal from the University of Heidelberg in late January 1933, he was stripped of his German citizenship as part of the German Reich's first list of denaturalizations in August 1933. He taught at the École libre des hautes études in Paris, and in Lyon, as well as continuing his political activities and helping other refugees. In 1939, he and his family received French citizenship.

In May 1940, following the German invasion of France, the family embarked on a second, perilous escape to the United States: Emil fled via Spain and Portugal, and their son Harald via an other escape route, while his wife Marieluise and her mother did not reach New York until 1941. He taught at the New School for Social Research and Columbia University in New York City until his death in 1966.

When he died of lung cancer in 1966, Gumbel's papers were made a part of The Emil J. Gumbel Collection, Political Papers of an Anti-Nazi Scholar in Weimar and Exile. These papers include reels of microfilm that document his activities against the Nazis.

== Influences ==
Emil Gumbel was strongly influenced from a young age by his uncle, Abraham Gumbel (1852-1930) with whom he had long conversations about political and social issues. The death of Abraham's son (Emil's cousin) in the First World War, is thought to have been a triggering factor in both Abraham and Emil's life-long commitment to pacifism.

During his time at the Ludwig-Maximilians-Universität München (1910-1914), Gumbel was taught mathematics, economics and the social sciences by eminent scholars known to have liberal political views, including Alfred Pringsheim and Lujo Brentano. He also studied actuarial science and gained insurance qualifications and work experience (including a summer job with a London insurance company), before completing his doctorate dissertation under the supervision of extraordinary professor of statistics Friedrich Böhm in July 1914.

At the Friedrich Wilhelm University of Berlin (1915-1922), Gumbel became closely associated with Georg Friedrich Nicolai, whose pacifist book, The Biology of War, was banned by the German Government. He also became acquainted with Albert Einstein, who was one of the founding members of the German League for Human Rights. Einstein was subsequently a strong supporter of Gumbel's professional career. Gumbel developed a deep professional bond with the prominent Russian statistician and economist Ladislaus von Bortkiewicz, who considered Gumbel to be "a gifted man [with an] uncommonly active mind". His recommendation strongly influenced Gumbel's subsequent appointment to professor of mathematics at Heidelberg University in 1922.

After the 1919 murder of prominent USPD member, Karl Liebknecht, who Gumbel greatly admired, there was strong criticism by journalist Kurt Tucholsky that the trial judge completely ignored evidence against the Nazi Brownshirts. Horrified, Gumbel ardently investigated many similar political murders that had occurred and published his findings in numerous publications and books, including Two Years of Murder in 1921, followed by Four Years of Political Murder in 1922, the deeply controversial Conspirators in 1924, The Armor of War of the Imperialistic States in 1928, which dealt with the causes of political murder, and Traitors fall victim to the Feme in 1929.

Gumbel was an admirer of the British intellectual and pacifist Bertrand Russell, though they never met. He translated some of Russell's work into German.

== Family ==
In 1930, Gumbel married Marieluise Czettritz, who he first met at the DLM offices in the mid-1920s. She had two sons from her previous marriage, and retained custody of the youngest, Harald. She died of cancer in 1952.

== Selected publications ==
- E. J. Gumbel (1919), Vier Jahre Lüge (Four Years of Lies), Berlin: Verlag Neues Vaterland
- E. J. Gumbel (1921), Zwei Jahre Mord (Two years of Murder), Berlin-Fichtenau: Verlag der neuen Gesellschaft
- E. J. Gumbel (1922), Vier Jahre politischer Mord (Four years of political murder), Berlin-Fichtenau: Verlag der neuen Gesellschaft
- E. J. Gumbel (1924), Verschwörer. Zur Geschichte und Soziologie der deutschnationalen Geheimbünde seit 1918-1924. (Conspirators. On the history and sociology of the German national secret societies since 1918-1924), Berlin: Malik-Verlag
- E. J. Gumbel (1928), Verschwörer. Die Kriegsrüstung der imperialistischen Staaten. (The Armaments of War of the Imperialist States), Rote Fahne
- E. J. Gumbel (1929), Verräter verfallen der Feme!: Fememorde in Bayern in den zwanziger Jahren. (Traitors fall victim to the Feme!: Feme murders in Bavaria in the 1920s)
- E. J. Gumbel (1937), The Extreme Duration of Human Life, Lyon: Hermann, doi:10.5281/zenodo.20179868 La durée extrême de la vie humaine (PDF)[French edition in modern LaTeX and translations into English and German "Die extreme Lebensdauer des Menschen" (2026). Zenodo].
- E. J. Gumbel (1958), Statistics of Extremes, New York: Columbia University Press, doi:10.7312/gumb92958. Dover reprint 2004 ISBN 978-0486436043
