= Hanns-Werner Heister =

German musicologist

Hanns-Werner Heister (born 14 June 1946) is a German musicologist.

== Life and career ==
Born in Plochingen, (Baden-Württemberg), Heister studied musicology, German literature and linguistics in Tübingen, Frankfurt a. M. and Berlin, received his doctorate in 1977 in Berlin on the aesthetics, sociology and history of the institution of the concert and habilitated in 1993 at the University of Oldenburg with studies on music analysis. From 1971 to 1992 he worked as a freelance music journalist for various radio stations, newspapers and magazines. After numerous lectureships and guest professorships (e.g. in Berlin, Hamburg, Dresden, Weimar and Vienna) he was professor for historical musicology and music communication in Dresden from 1992 to 1998 and professor for musicology in Hamburg from 1998 until his Emeritus in 2011. He is co-editor of the encyclopaedia Komponisten der Gegenwart, which has been published as looseleaf service since 1992.

=== Research ===
His research is centered on an analysis of music and music culture that is critical of power and society and can be divided into four areas:

1. Music sociological question: Music in social reality, both in the present and in history (since 1970; programmatically musicology as social science at the International Musicological Congress Bonn 1970). The focus is on media/institutions such as the concert or the jukebox, background music, sound ecology, open-air music, music during Nazism, in resistance and exile.
2. Music aesthetic question: Social and natural reality in music. The focus here is on music as a specific language. A first focus is political music, in which the conscious reference to society is condensed. Further focal points are the combination of music with other arts, opera and music theatre as well as music and fine arts and finally, aspects of the Gesamtkunstwerk and elements of the arts. Mathematics also belongs to the field of music-language, which has been researched more intensively since 2001; in addition to its significance for structural issues, it also serves to deepen and broaden the musical semantics. For a theory of similarity and a specification of fuzziness, Heister has also been using fuzzy logic since 2009.
3. Music-cultural-geographic ("music-ethnological") question: Music in its global cultural and idiomatic differentiation. The starting point was the interest in the new, different, unusual, foreign; scientific occupation with jazz (since 1978), Latin American music (since 1984) and Isang Yun (since 1987), improvisation (since 2008).
4. Music anthropological question: Music and human nature / human nature in music (since 1984). The focus here is on the beginnings of music, the development of art, music and the human senses (concretised in the concept of the 'Mimetic Ceremony'). Since 2005, Heister has increasingly included psychoanalysis in his work.

== Publications ==
- Das Konzert. Theorie einer Kulturform, 2 volumes, Wilhelmshaven 1983 (Verlag F. Noetzel)
- Jazz, Kassel among others 1983 (Bärenreiter-Verlag)
- Vom allgemeingültigen Neuen. Analysen engagierter Musik: Dessau, Eisler, Ginastera, Hartmann, edited by Thomas Phleps and Wieland Reich, Saarbrücken 2006 (Pfau-Verlag)
- (with Ines Gellrich, Photographien) Un/Endlichkeit. Begegnungen mit György Ligeti, Freiburg i. Br. 2008 (Modo-Verlag)
- Hintergrund Klangkunst. Ein Beitrag zur akustischen Ökologie (edition neue zeitschrift für musik, hed. Rolf W. Stoll), Mainz 2010 (Verlag Schott Music)
- Musik und Musikpolitik im faschistischen Deutschland, Frankfurt. 1984 (Fischer Taschenbuch)
- (with W.-W. Sparrer) Der Komponist Isang Yun, Munich 1987; 2. erw. Aufl. Munich 1997 (Verlag text+kritik)
- (with W.-W. Sparrer) Komponisten der Gegenwart 4 volumes (Loseblatt-Lexikon, since 1992, bislang 43 Lieferungen). Munich (Verlag text+kritik)
- Zwischen Aufklärung & Kulturindustrie, 3 volumes, Hamburg 1993 (Von Bockel-Verlag)
- Charles Ives, 1874–1954. Amerikanischer Pionier der Neuen Musik¸ Trier 2004 (Atlantische Texte, vol. 23)
- Musik und. Eine Schriftenreihe der Hochschule für Musik und Theater Hamburg, 3 vol., 2000, Hamburg, Von Bockel-Verlag; Neue Folge, 11 volumes, 2001–2011 (Weidler Buchverlag Berlin)
- Zwischen/Töne. Musik und andere Künste, series, from 1995 (Weidler Buchverlag Berlin)
- [Nachlaß-Edition] Harry Goldschmidt: Das Wort in instrumentaler Musik: Die Ritornelle in Schuberts Winterreise, Hamburg 1996 (Zwischen/Töne. Musik und andere Künste, vol. 1) (Von Bockel-Verlag)
- [Nachlaß-Edition]: Harry Goldschmidt: Das Wort in Beethovens Instrumentalbegleitung (Beethoven-Studien III), Cologne among others 1999 (Europäische Kulturstudien, vol. 9) (Verlag Böhlau)
- Musik/Revolution, 3 volumes, Hamburg 1996/97 (Von Bockel-Verlag)
- "Entartete Musik" 1938 – Weimar und die Ambivalenz, 2 volumes, Saarbrücken 2001 (Pfau-Verlag)
- Geschichte der Musik im 20. Jahrhundert, vol. III: 1945–1975, Laaber 2005 (Laaber-Verlag)
- Zur Ambivalenz der Moderne (Reihe Musik/Gesellschaft/Geschichte), 4 volumes, vol. 1 2005; vol. 2–4 2007 (Weidler Buchverlag Berlin)
- Schichten, Geschichte, System. Geologische Metaphern und Denkformen in den Kunstwissenschaften (Reihe Zwischen/Töne, neue Folge, vol. 6), Berlin 2016 (Weidler Buchverlag)
- (with Hanjo Polk) Bewegtes und Bewegendes. Der Motiv-Begriff in Künsten und Wissenschaften (Reihe Musik/Gesellschaft/Geschichte, vol. 7), Berlin 2017 (Weidler Buchverlag)
- Die Ehrenmitglieder der Staatstheater Stuttgart 1912–2018 Theatergeschichte in Portraits. Stuttgart 2018 (Kohlhammer Verlag)

== Festschrift ==
- Thomas Phleps and Wieland Reich (eds.): Musik-Kontexte. Festschrift für Hanns-Werner Heister, 2 volumes, Münster 2011. Verlagshaus Monsenstein und Vannerdat. ISBN 978-3-86991-320-9
