= Wilhelm Heinitz =

German musicologist

Wilhelm Heinitz (9 December 1883 in Altona – 31 March 1963 in Hamburg) was a German musicologist.

After training and working as a bassoonist, Heinitz became a member of staff at the Phonetics Laboratory of the University of Hamburg in 1915 and studied musicology there. He received his doctorate (PhD) on a topic of phonetics in 1920 in Kiel and his habilitation in 1931 with the paper Strukturprobleme in primitiver Musik at the University of Hamburg, where he subsequently headed the research department for comparative musicology until 1949. In November 1933 he signed the vow of allegiance of the Professors of the German Universities and High-Schools to Adolf Hitler and the National Socialistic State.

Heinitz died at the age of 79.

== Work ==
Books

- Vorstudien über die Psychologischen Arbeitsbedingungen des Maschinenschreibens, 1922
- Instrumentenkunde (Ernst Bückens Handbuch der Musikwissenschaft), 1929
- Instrumentenkunde. Die Musik der aussereuropäischen Natur- und Kulturvölker / Robert Lachmann., 1934
- Neue Wege der Volksmusikforschung Mit einer wissenschaftlichen Einführung in die Homogenitätslehre u.d. physiologische Resonanz.
- Was kann die vergleichende Musikwissenschaft zur Indogermanenfrage beitragen?., 1936
- Taktprobleme in J. S. Bachs "Wohltemperiertem Klavier" (Fs Max Schneider...), 1955

Articles

- Experimentelle Untersuchungen über musikalische Reproduktionen, 1915
- Eine lexikalische Ordnung für die vergleichende Betrachtung von Melodien, 1921

== Literature ==
- Thomas Phleps: Ein stiller, verbissener und zäher Kampf um Stetigkeit – Musikwissenschaft in NS-Deutschland und ihre vergangenheitspolitische Bewältigung, in Isolde v. Foerster et al. (ed.), Musikforschung – Nationalsozialismus – Faschismus, Mainz 2001, pp. 471–488. online Uni Giessen
- Horst Seeger: Musiklexikon Personen A–Z / Deutscher Verlag für Musik Leipzig (1981) p. 328
