= Stoppel =

Stoppel is a German surname. Notable people with the surname include:

- Franz Stoppel (1931–2007), Austrian chess master
- Rose Stoppel (1874–1970), German botanist and plant physiologist
