= Rudolf Vierhaus =

German historian (1922–2011)

Rudolf Vierhaus (29 October 1922 – 13 November 2011) was a German historian who mainly researched the Early modern period. He had been a professor at the newly founded Ruhr University Bochum since 1964. From 1971, he was director of the Max-Planck-Institut für Geschichte in Göttingen. He became known for his research on the Age of Enlightenment.

== Life ==
Born in Wanne-Eickel, the son of a coalminer was the first of his family to attend the Oberrealschule and passed his Abitur in 1941. In the same year, he was called up for military service. As a lieutenant, he was seriously wounded in the battle with American troops at the Moselle in autumn 1944. Vierhaus was captured in Marburg the following year. He spent the following years in military hospitals and clinics. It was not until 1949 that his state of health was reasonably restored.

From 1949 he studied history and philosophy at the Westfälische Wilhelms-Universität . His academic teachers were Kurt von Raumer, Herbert Grundmann and Joachim Ritter. Vierhaus was also influenced by Werner Conze and his study group for social history. In 1955, Vierhaus received his doctorate under Raumer on the topic Ranke und die soziale Welt. His habilitation was awarded in 1961 on Deutschland im Zeitalter der Aufklärung – Untersuchungen zur deutschen Sozialgeschichte im Zeitalter der Aufklärung. The thesis remained unpublished. His most important trains of thought were published in essays in 1965 and 1985, which in turn were published in 1987 in the anthology Deutschland im 18. Jahrhundert – Politische Verfassung, soziales Gefüge, geistige Bewegungen. From 1961, Vierhaus was a private lecturer in Münster. Several substitute professorships followed.

While filling the chair of Franz Schnabel in Munich, he received appointments to Frankfurt and Bochum. In 1964, Vierhaus became the first historian to be appointed full professor at the newly founded Ruhr-Universität Bochum. In 1966/67, he taught as a visiting professor at the St Antony's College, Oxford. He declined an appointment to the University of Münster.

Since 1968, Vierhaus has been a part-time co-director of the Max Planck Institute for History in Göttingen and from 1971 alongside Josef Fleckenstein, director of the institute. There he provided fresh impetus for the raising of standards at for the Institute and for the study of history in Germany. One aspect of this was his policy of recruiting foreign academics to fill vacancies at the institute. As director at the institution, Vierhaus also played a major role in supporting the establishment of a "Mission Historique Française en Allemagne" in Göttingen (1977-2009). Vierhaus held honorary professorships at the Ruhr University Bochum and at the University of Göttingen. He retired in 1990 after which he supported the integration of East German historical studies. From 1990 to 1997 he was the founding chairman of the Deutsch-tschechische Historikerkommission.

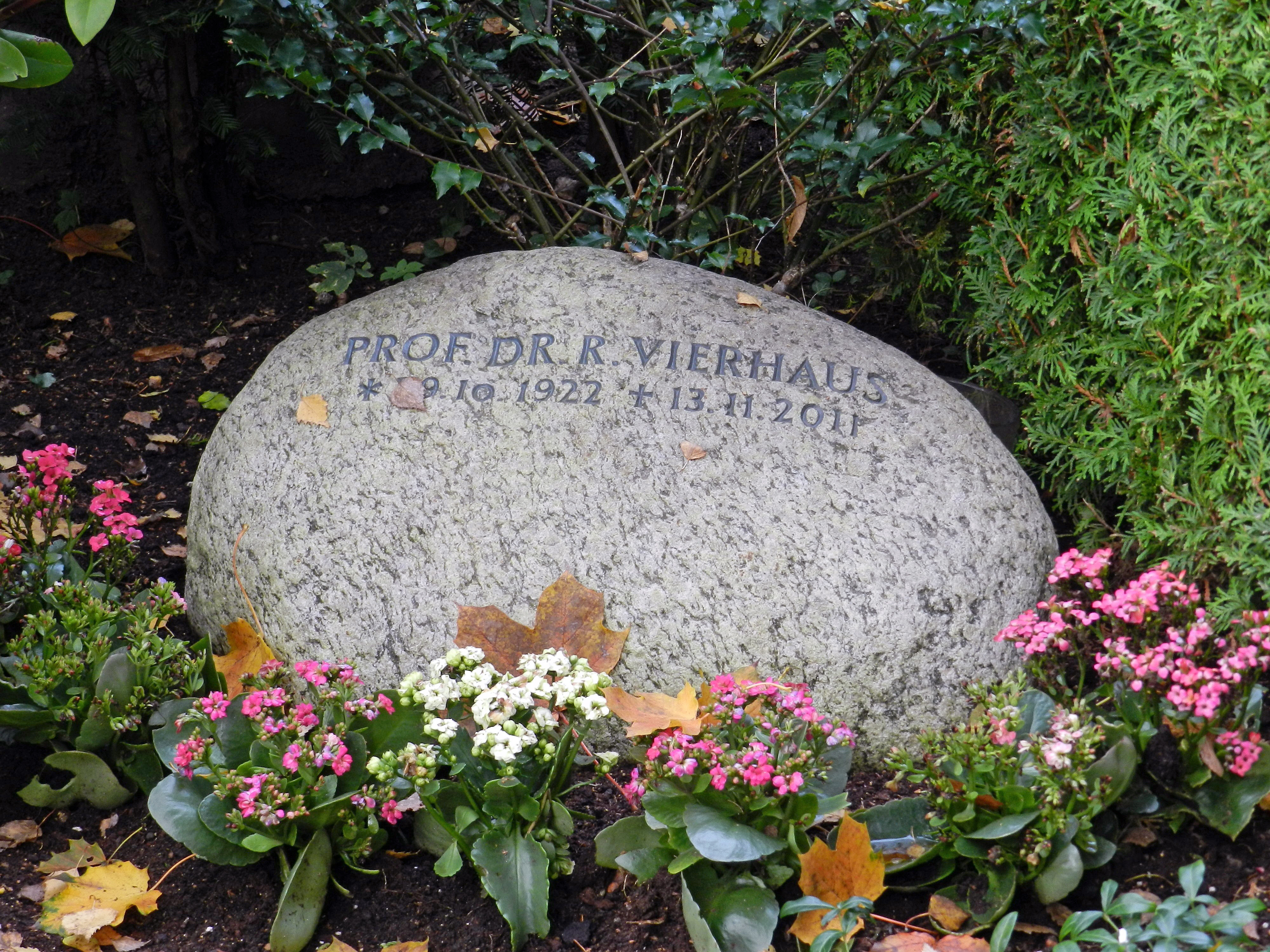
Grave t the Friedhof Nikolassee

Vierhaus died in Berlin at the age of 89.

== Work ==
Vierhaus' areas of research were modern history, especially comparative social, constitutional, idea, scientific, educational and cultural history since the early modern period. In his early years, he was particularly concerned with the history of the 19th century, at times also with the German and European development of the early 20th century. In 1960, the edition of the diary of Hildegard von Spitzemberg appeared in the series of German Historical Sources of the 19th and 20th Century. In the 1970s, he increasingly focused on the history of the 17th and 18th centuries. This resulted in the authoritative overall depictions, Deutschland im Zeitalter des Absolutismus (1978) and, as part of the Propyläen Geschichte Deutschlands, the Staaten und Stände (1984). His studies of the German and European Enlightenment were decisive. Vierhaus pleads for a new cultural history, which he sees as an extension of social history. As a methodological foundation, he recommends the reconstruction of historical life worlds, which he describes in his essay Die Rekonstruktion historischer Lebenswelten. Problems of modern cultural historiography. His main works also include the essay collection Deutschland im 18. Jahrhundert. Politische Verfassung. Soziales Gefüge. Geistige Bewegungen (Göttingen 1987) as well as his collected contributions to the history of the 19th and 20th century, which were published on the occasion of his 80th birthday under the title Vergangenheit als Geschichte (Göttingen, 2003). Vierhaus was editor of the Deutsche Biographische Enzyklopädie from its fourth volume on. After his retirement, his main areas of research were the history of education, the history of religion, especially the social history of the churches, piety and religious behaviour, and the history of science.

As an academic teacher, Vierhaus supervised works from the late Middle Ages to post-war history. This led to fundamental studies on the concept of freedom in the 18th century (Jürgen Schlumbohm), on the understanding of humanity and humanity in the late Enlightenment (Hans Erich Bödeker), on the emergence of the concept of absolutism (Reinhard Blänkner) and on the "Ideologie des deutschen Weges" in the historiography of the interwar period (Bernd Faulenbach). Another student of Vierhaus is Horst Dippel.

Vierhaus has been awarded numerous scientific honours and memberships for his research. In 1964, he became a full member and in 2006 a corresponding member of the Historical Commission for Westphalia. Biographical information on the pages of the Historical Commission for Westphalia] He was a member of the Historical Commission for Lower Saxony and Bremen and since 1985 a full member of the Akademie der Wissenschaften zu Göttingen. Federal President Richard von Weizsäcker honoured Vierhaus on 23 May 1986 in Bonn with the Order of Merit of the Federal Republic of Germany. Also in 1986, Vierhaus was awarded the Prix Alexander von Humboldt pour la coopération scientifique Franco-allemande. In 1988, he was awarded the Lower Saxony Order of Merit (1st Class). The Hebrew University of Jerusalem made him an "Honorary Fellow" in 1990. The Comillas Pontifical University awarded Vierhaus the "Primer socio de Honor" in 1991. In 1992, he was awarded an honorary doctorate by the Loránd Eötvös University. The President of the Czech Republic Václav Havel awarded him the Medal of Merit (Czech Republic) in Prague in 1998. Also in 1998, he was awarded the Order of Merit of the Federal Republic of Germany. Festschrifts were dedicated to him on his 60th, 70th and 80th birthday. The Ruhr-Universität Bochum honoured Vierhaus in 2012 with a symposium "Geschichte als erfahrene und gedeutete Vergangenheit".

== Publications ==
Monographs

- Ranke und die soziale Welt. Diss. phil. Münster 1957 (Neue Münstersche Beiträge zur Geschichtsforschung, vol. 1), Münster 1957.
- Deutschland im 18. Jahrhundert. Politische Verfassung, soziales Gefüge, geistige Bewegungen. Ausgewählte Aufsätze. Göttingen 1987, ISBN 3-525-36216-1.
- Deutschland im Zeitalter des Absolutismus (1648–1763). 2nd edition. Vandenhoeck & Ruprecht, Göttingen, 1984, ISBN 3-525-33504-0.
- Staaten und Stände. Vom Westfälischen bis zum Hubertusburger Frieden 1648 bis 1763 (Propyläen Geschichte Deutschlands. Vol 5). Berlin 1984, ISBN 3-549-05815-2.

As editor

- Deutsche Biographische Enzyklopädie from volume IV.
- Frühe Neuzeit – frühe Moderne? Forschungen zur Vielschichtigkeit von Übergangsprozessen. Göttingen 1992, ISBN 3-525-35641-2.
- with Gerhard A. Ritter: Aspekte der historischen Forschung in Frankreich und Deutschland. Schwerpunkte und Methoden = Aspects de la recherche historique en France et en Allemagne. Göttingen 1981, ISBN 3-525-35383-9.
- Bürger und Bürgerlichkeit im Zeitalter der Aufklärung. Heidelberg 1981.
- Das Tagebuch der Baronin Spitzemberg, geb. Freiin von Varnbüler. Aufzeichnungen aus der Hofgesellschaft des Hohenzollernreiches. (Deutsche Geschichtsquellen des 19. und 20. Jahrhunderts, vol. 43.) Göttingen 1960.
- Rudolf Vierhaus, Ludolf Herbst (ed.), Bruno Jahn (Mitarb.): Biographisches Handbuch der Mitglieder des Deutschen Bundestages. 1949–2002. K. G. Saur, Munich 2002–2003
  - Vol. 1: A–M., 2002, ISBN 978-3-598-23782-9 and ISBN 3-598-23782-0; Vorschau
  - Vol. 2: N–Z. Anhang., 2003, ISBN 978-3-598-23782-9 and ISBN 3-598-23782-0.
  - Vol. 3: Zeittafel – Verzeichnisse – Ausschüsse. ISBN 978-3-598-23783-6 and ISBN 3-598-23783-9.
- Der Adel vor der Revolution; zur sozialen und politischen Funktion des Adels im vorrevolutionären Europa.
