= Hermann Eidmann =

German entomologist and zoologist (1897–1949)

Hermann August Eidmann (21 February 1897 – 4 September 1949) was a German forest zoologist and a professor at the forest institute in Hannoversch Münden and also served in the Reich Institut for forest research in Hamburg-Reinbek. He was the author of a textbook of entomology and had a special interest in ants.

== Life and work ==
Eidmann was born near Alsfeld in Hesse to forester Hermann (1862–1932) and Maria Paulina née Rouge (1867–1947). He grew up exploring forests as a boy and went to study natural sciences at the University of Giessen and the Ludwig-Maximilians-Universität München. He received a doctorate from the Ludwig-Maximilians-Universität München under Richard Hertwig. He then became Hertwig's assistant and later worked under Karl Escherich and habilitated in 1925. In 1924, he studied the ant fauna of Spain and three years later went to Shanghai as a professor of biology at the Tongji University but political turmoil led to his return in a few months. He travelled through Japan and Manchuria on his return. In 1929, he went to the forestry institute (formerly the Königlich Preußische Forstakademie) at Hannoversch Münden to succeed Ludwig Rhumbler as head of zoology. He went on research trips around the world including Labrador (1931), Brazil (1933) and Guinea (1939-40) and developed the department of forest zoology. He attended the 4th International Entomological Congress where he spoke on the beneficial impacts of ants like Formica rufa for forestry. In 1933, he was a signatory to the Vow of allegiance of the Professors of the German Universities and High-Schools to Adolf Hitler and the National Socialistic State. In 1933, he became rector at the Münden Forestry Academy which had been made Jew-free by the end of March with the expulsion of Richard Falck. He published a textbook of entomology in 1941. From 1942 he also directed the zoology department of the Reichsinstitut für ausländische und koloniale Forstwirtschaft in Hamburg-Reinbek.

Eidmann married Hilda Bach in 1922 and they had two daughters. He died at Mittenwald.
