= Edgar Wedekind =

German chemist

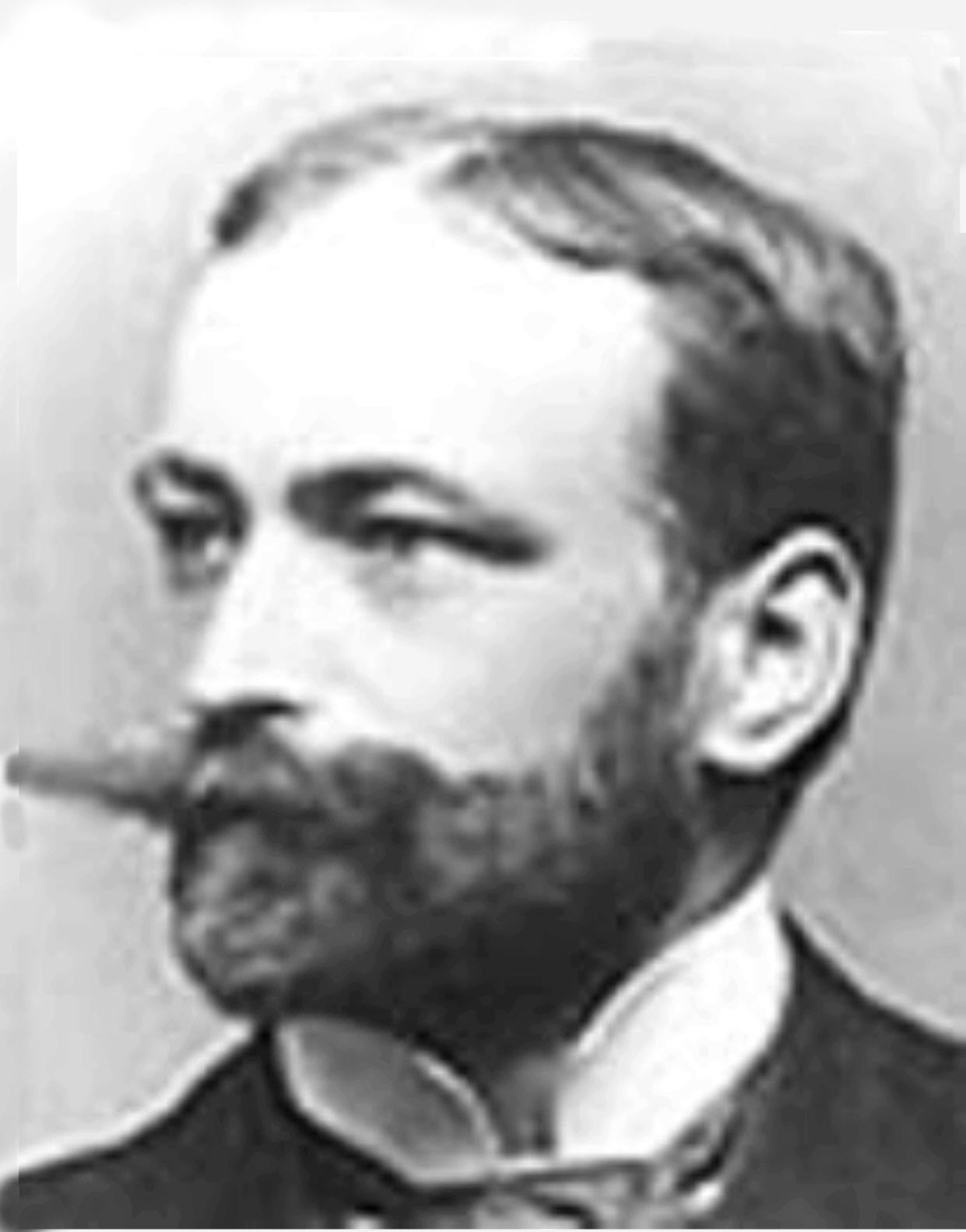
Portrait from around 1899

Edgar Leon Waldemar Otto Wedekind (31 January 1870 - 22 October 1938) was a German chemist and teacher at Hannoversch-Münden. He was one of the signatories for the Vow of allegiance of the Professors of the German Universities and High-Schools to Adolf Hitler and the National Socialistic State (1933).

Wedekind was born in Altona (near Hamburg) and studied chemistry, receiving a doctorate from Munich in 1895 for studies on Tetrazolium under Hans von Pechmann, He received a habilitation from the University of Leipzig in 1899. He then taught chemistry at the Universities of Tübingen, Strasbourg, Frankfurt, Göttingen as well as at the forestry university Hannoversch-Münden and from 1938, he was a member of the Erfurt academy. He worked with the mycologist Richard Falck and analyzed the antibiotic sparassol. He defended Falck against anti-semitism but was, in November 1933, a signatory to the Bekenntnis der Professoren an den Universitäten und Hochschulen zu Adolf Hitler und dem nationalsozialistischen Staat (or Vow of allegiance of professors at the German universities and colleges to Adolf Hitler and the National Socialist state).

Wedekind worked on stereochemistry and magnetochemistry and was close to identifying ketenes when he treated Ph_{2}CHCOCl with n-Pr_{3}N in 1901 at Tübingen. He suggested that it produced the intermediate Ph_{2}C-C=O but ketene was later isolated by Hermann Staudinger in 1905. He died at Erfurt.
