= Georg Anschütz =

German psychologist

Georg Ernst Anschütz (15 November 1886 – 25 December 1953) was a German psychologist, who worked especially in the field of music psychology and synaesthesia. Due to his exposed role during the National Socialism period, he was dismissed from university service after 1945. His writings were nevertheless reprinted until the 1970s.

== Life ==
Anschütz was born in Braunschweig as the son of the late deaf-mute teacher Chr. Anschütz and his wife Elwine, both of Prussian nationality and Evangelical Lutheran faith. He attended the citizen school there for three and a half years and the Wilhelm-Gymnasium for nine years. After his Abitur in 1905, he studied philosophy, psychology and pedagogy in Leipzig and Munich. In 1908, he received his doctorate in Munich under Theodor Lipps with a thesis. Afterwards, he stayed for studies in Würzburg and Berlin and went to Paris for one year, where he worked with Alfred Binet in his psychology-pedagogy laboratory. From this time, he wrote the German adaptation of Binet's work "Les idees modernes sur les enfants" under the German title Die neuen Gedanken über das Schulkind. In 1910, he returned to Munich, where he stayed until the end of 1911. During this time he published his first major work Über die Methoden der Psychologie, which was soon followed by a second Spekulative, exakt und angewandte Psychologie. To support his scientific work he was twice awarded the Froschammer Philosophy Scholarship by the Faculty of Philosophy of the Ludwig-Maximilians-Universität München. After further stays abroad, mainly in Austria, Italy and Switzerland, he moved to Leipzig in early 1912, where he worked with Wilhelm Wundt and Eduard Spranger.

=== Activity in Hamburg ===
In Hamburg from 1913 to 1915, Anschütz was assistant to the experimental psychologist Ernst Meumann in his psychological laboratory. From 1915 to 1918, he taught as a visiting professor in Constantinople. In 1920, he was habilitated at the newly founded University of Hamburg and appointed as a private lecturer, but under Meumann's successor (William Stern) he could not at first obtain a permanent position. In addition to teaching and non-scientific activities, Anschütz distinguished himself at the time as a pioneer of synaesthesia and, from 1927, organized several congresses on this topic, which were aimed at both scientists and interested laypeople. In 1931, Anschütz was appointed as an (unpaid) associate professor.

=== Period of National Socialism ===
Anschütz profited directly from the rise of the National Socialists: After his Jewish institute director Stern had already been dismissed in April 1933 under the Law for the Restoration of the Professional Civil Service, Anschütz finally received the longed-for assistant position in November 1933. The position had previously been held by Martha Muchow who had been driven to suicide by the Nazis. Already on 1 May 1933, Anschütz had joined the NSDAP, and on 11 November 1933, he signed the Vow of allegiance of the Professors of the German Universities and High-Schools to Adolf Hitler and the National Socialistic State. From 1939 to 1945, Anschütz was the leader of the teaching staff at Hamburg University and Gaudozentenbundführer of Hamburg. In this capacity, he was responsible for the political scrutiny of his colleagues and influenced the appointment of professorships. In 1942, he finally received an associate professorship for psychology and at the same time took over the management of the Psychological Institute, which had until then been provisionally headed by the National Socialist Gustaf Deuchler. In 1944, Anschütz was awarded the War Merit Cross I. Class/

=== Post-war period ===
Due to his exposed position as a lecturer leader, Anschütz was temporarily interned after the war and permanently dismissed from university service. At the end of the 1940s, he founded a "Free Research Center for Psychology and Frontier Areas of Knowledge" in which he worked with laymen and other dismissed Nazi scientists and which dealt, among other things, with phenomena of occultism. In addition, Anschütz also supervised dissertations in the Soviet occupation zone. Shortly before his death, he published under the title Psychology a comprehensive overall presentation of the subject, which was honoured by colleagues as a "life's work". Especially his Abriss der Musikästhetik from 1930 was received and repeatedly published until the 1970s.

Anschütz died in Hamburg at the age of 67.

== Literature ==
- Anton F. Guhl: "Anschütz, Georg." In Franklin Kopitzsch, Dirk Brietzke (ed.): Hamburgische Biografie. Vol 6. Wallstein, Göttingen 2012, ISBN 978-3-8353-1025-4, pp. .16–18.
- Michael Grüttner: Biographisches Lexikon zur nationalsozialistischen Wissenschaftspolitik. Heidelberg 2004, ISBN 3-935025-68-8, p. 15.
- Ernst Klee: Das Personenlexikon zum Dritten Reich. S. Fischer, Frankfurt/Main 2003, ISBN 3-10-039309-0.
- Reichshandbuch der Deutschen Gesellschaft – Das Handbuch der Persönlichkeiten in Wort und Bild. Deutscher Wirtschaftsverlag, Berlin 1930, 1st volume, p. 29, ISBN 3-598-30664-4.
