= Ernst Hertel =

German ophthalmologist (1870–1943)

- Born: 19 March 1870
- Died: 10 March 1943 (aged 72)
- Known for: Hertel exophthalmometry
- Scientific career
- Fields: Ophthalmologist

Ernst Hertel (19 March 1870 – 10 March 1943) was a German ophthalmologist.

== Career ==
Hertel received his medical degree in Jena, Germany in 1895. In 1910 he became Chair of Ophthalmology at the University of Strasbourg, succeeding Jakob Stilling. After the First World War, Hertel moved to Berlin before leaving for the University of Leipzig in 1920, where he remained until his retirement in 1935.

Hertel invented the Hertel exophthalmometer, a method of measuring eye displacement. With his colleague, Jakob Stilling, he developed the Stilling-Hertel test for colour vision deficiency.

== Politics ==
In November 1933, Hertel signed a vow of allegiance to Adolf Hitler.
