= Eberhard Hempel =

German art historian

- Born: 30 July 1886; Dresden, German Empire
- Died: 16 September 1967 (aged 81); Dresden, East Germany
- Occupation: Art historian

Eberhard Hempel (born 30 July 1886, Dresden — died 16 September 1967, Dresden) was a German art historian and professor at the TU Dresden specializing in the Baroque era. He was the author of the first modern monograph on Borromini in 1924.

== Early life ==
Eberhard Hempel was born on 30 July 1886 to chemist Walther Hempel and Louisa Delia Hempel, née Monks.

== Education ==
Hempel attended the Vitzthum Gymnasium in Dresden. From 1907 to 1914, he studied in Berlin, Vienna, and Munich until finishing his doctorate, Carlo Rainaldi: Ein Beitrag zur Geschichte des Barocks, with Heinrich Wölfflin. He received his habilitation in 1924 with a monograph on Francesco Borromini.

== Academic career ==
Hempel worked at the Albertina in Vienna until 1931, when he was appointed an associate professor at the University of Graz. In 1933, Hempel became a full professor at Dresden Technical University. In November 1933, he signed the German Professors' Pledge of Commitment to Adolf Hitler and was charged with the managing of Cornelius Gurlitt's collection. At this time, he also joined Der Stahlhelm, though his contingent was merged into the Sturmabteilung in 1934.

== Bibliography ==
- Carlo Rainaldi. Ein Werk des römisches Barocks (1919)
- Das Werk Michael Pachers (1931)
- Die katholische Hofkirche zu Dresden (1972)
