= Richard Falck =

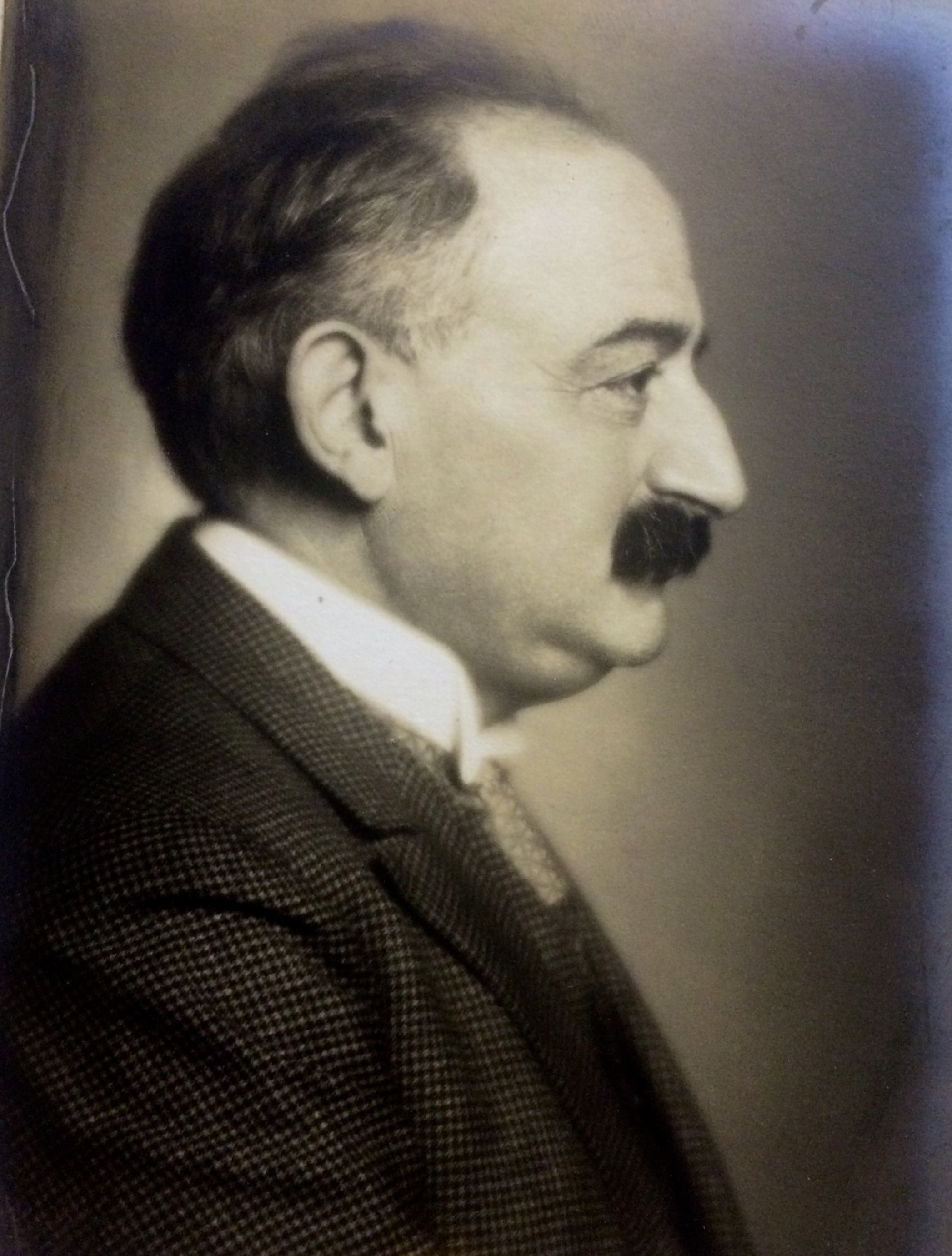

Richard Falck (7 May 1873 – 1 January 1955) was a German-American botanist and mycologist, who worked as a professor of mycology at the forest academy in Hannoversch Münden before he fled Nazi Germany and the persecution of Jews to finally settle in the United States of America. Falck was a specialist on fungi and on the preservation of timber from fungal damage.

== Life and work ==
Falck was born in Landeck in Westpreußen (West Prussia) to Julius and Rosa née Baruch. Richard's father was in the dye business. Richard was the oldest and had two brothers and sisters. His brother Georg later became an architect of repute; his brother Eduard who ran a mushroom business was murdered in Auschwitz; one sister survived the Holocaust. Little is known of Richard's early years but he lived in Ledyczek until the age of 16, went to Progymnasium in Debrzno, trained as a pharmacist, and in 1899 he passed the examination of food chemists at Göttingen. In 1902 he began his mycological studies under Oscar Brefeld and obtained a doctorate from the University of Breslau with a thesis "Über die Kultur der Oidien und ihre Rückführung in die höhere Fruchtform bei den Basidiomyceten." Among his contacts was Alfred Möller, Director of the Forestry Academy in Eberswald who was also a student of Oscar Brefeld. Through Möller's influence Falck was able to obtain a position in mycology in Hannoversch Münden. He married Breslau mycologist Olga Schenkalowski in 1910, shortly after his appointment as a professor of mycology at the Königlich Preußische Forstakademie. They had a daughter Marianne in 1914. His research on edible mushrooms found application during the First World War. In 1923, along with Edgar Wedekind, he identified an antibiotic produced by Sparassis ramosa that they called sparassol. He then worked on the preservation of wood and the prevention of its decomposition. During the Nazi years, he was threatened for being Jewish but protected by Otto Braun, the Prussian minister of agriculture. The students however boycotted his lectures. During this period he obtained a patent for the "Falkamesam Process" of preserving wood, on which he had collaborated with the Indian researcher Sonti Kamesam. An allegation of tax evasion was made by a member of the Göttingen National Socialists as he had filed many of his patents in Poland. In March 1933 he fled via Rome to Palestine and then moved to Poland. His daughter stayed on in Palestine. Two of his assistants back in Germany, Otto Reis and Käthe Löwenthal, were murdered in the Holocaust. His German citizenship was revoked in 1938. When Germany invaded Poland in 1939, the family fled again to the Soviet Union. His research while in Moscow and Kiev was not very fruitful. He endorsed the Lamarckian views of Trofim Lysenko and was given a free hand by the Soviet government. In 1941 they had to evacuate from the Soviet Union but his wife Olga fell ill in Moscow and died in 1944. In August 1945 he left Moscow and moved to Palestine where his daughter lived. He worked in Tiberias and Haifa from 1946 and 1950 after which he moved to the United States of America. In 1947 he was rehabilitated and awarded the rights of a retired professor and reparations were ordered but he received payments only in 1954, a year before he died in Atlanta, Georgia. A biography was published in Germany in 2019.

== Bibliography ==
- 1912. Die Merulius-Fäule des Bauholzes. Ed G. Fischer. 405 pp.
- 1912. Julius Oscar Brefeld, Richard Falck. Investigations in the overall field of mycology: Continuation of the molds and yeasts. Ed Heinrich Schöningh Wilkes-Barre, Pa. 59 pp.
- 1923. Mykologische Berichte und Untersuchungen, Volume 1, Part 2. Ed Druck und Verlag für Aktiengesellschaft, vorm. Gebr. Gotthelft. 300 pp.
- 1934. Richard Falck, Hermann Lutz, Gertrude Krafft. Effects of physical methods of preliminary treatment of beech wood: The Influence of steaming, storing, periodic steaming and drying of severe upon the improvement in swelling and shrinkage. Ed USDA, Forest Service, Forest Products Laboratory. 178 pp.
- 1935. Richard Falck, Vinayak Ketkar, Gertrude Krafft. Testing and Evaluating Fireproofing materials for wood. Ed USDA, Forest Service, Forest Products Laboratory. 112 pp.
- 1950. The types of symbiotic linkage and Their significance for the formation of highly Organized forms: functions and life-spheres in the phylogenetic process of development. 16 pp.
- 1954. Richard Falck, Marianne Falck. Die Bedeutung der Fadenpilze als Symbionten der Pflanzen für die Waldkultur. Sauerländer JD Ed. 92 pp.
