= Hermann Stephani =

German musicologist

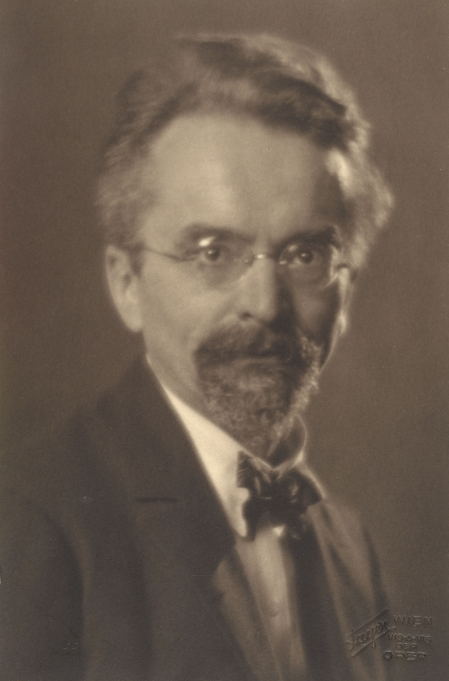
Hermann Stephani (1877–1960) 1927 © Georg Fayer (1892–1950) OeNB

Hermann Stephani (23 June 1877 – 3 December 1960) was a German musicologist and lecturer at the University of Marburg.

== Life ==
Born in Grimma, Stephani received his doctorate in psychology from the Ludwig-Maximilians-Universität München in 1902 under Theodor Lipps. He studied music under Felix Draeseke and became the first director of the "Felix-Draeseke-Gesellschaft". After several positions as choir and orchestra conductor, he settled in Eisleben in 1906 as organist and church music director. In 1921, he was appointed first professor of musicology at the University of Marburg. He habilitated there on 12 November 1921 and held his inaugural lecture the same day. In the following year, he founded the Collegium musicum (instrumentale), reorganised the choir, became director of the "Musikwissenschaftliches Seminar" (Musicology Seminar), which he had newly founded in 1925, introduced musicology as a major subject in 1927, was appointed as a professor and was soon appointed "Staatlichen Musikfachberater". Stephani remained an unofficial professor until 1942, when he turned 65, and continued to teach from May 1942 to May 1945 with a teaching assignment.

In 1932, he signed an appeal of the Kampfbund für deutsche Kultur of Alfred Rosenberg, after he had already turned against atonale music and its Jewish originators in 1926 in a paper. After the Machtergreifung, he became supporting member of the SS. He was also a member of the National Socialist Teachers League. In November 1933, Stephani signed the Vow of allegiance of the Professors of the German Universities and High-Schools to Adolf Hitler and the National Socialistic State. On 1 May 1937, he joined the Nazi Party, and in 1939 the NS-Dozentenbund. He was also a member of the Reichskolonialbund and the German German Society for Racial Hygiene. As a father of four, he was under strong economic pressure, and as such he was under great economic pressure.

One of his main topic was "German" music from Bach to Anton Bruckner, with lectures on Bach, Mozart or Beethoven, on classical and romantic music, on German song, opera and musical drama.

"My two predecessors [as university music directors], Richard Barth and Gustav Jenner, had come to Marburg through Brahms' intercession and had established a stronghold for the cultivation of Brahms. I immediately began to emphasize the care of Bruckner, tried to build a bridge between Marburg's classicistic attitude and the music of that time and anchored the choir's activities in four major performances a year. The last German St. Matthew Passion before the collapse of Marburg sounded during [!] air-raid warning on March 11, 1945; with it, I bid farewell to the office I had become fond of" (from the curriculum vitae 1945).

Stephani's lasting significance lies above all in his treatment of Georg Friedrich Händel's oratorios. In doing so, he tried to change their Jewish Old Testament character without any outside pressure. For Judas Maccabeus, first edited in 1904 under the title "Judas Makkabäus. Oratorio in three acts by G. F. Handel" (published Leipzig: Kistner & Siegel; 150 performances until 1933, including in the United States); edited a second time in 1939 under the title "Der Feldherr. Freiheits-Oratorio by G. F. Händel" (published Leipzig: Kistner & Siegel). Also for Jephthah, first edited in 1911 under the title "Jephta. Oratorio v. G. F. Händel" (published: Leipzig: Leuckart; until 1941 a total of 150 performances); edited a second time in 1941 under the title "Das Opfer. Oratorio by G. F. Händel" (published Leipzig: Leuckart).

== Publications ==
- Das Erhabene insonderheit in der Tonkunst und das Problem der Form im Musikalisch-Schönen und Erhabenen, Privatdruck 1903.
- Händels Judas Makkabäus. In Die Musik 8 (1908), S. 2–7.
- Der Charakter der Tonarten, Regensburg: Gustav Bosse Verlag 1923.
- Grundfragen des Musikhörens, Leipzig 1926
- Zur Psychologie des musikalischen Hörens. Gustav Bosse, 1956
