= Sonti Kamesam =

Sonti Kamesam (1890–30 November 1952) was an Indian timber engineer and scientist who worked at the Forest Research Institute, Dehra Dun. He is best known for his patented wood preservative, ASCU, from the chemical symbols for Arsenic and Copper. The treatment was patented in Britain from 1934 and in the US from 1938. It also went by the name of Chromated Copper Arsenate or CCA in the United States of America from around the 1950s. In his treatment, copper is a fungicide, arsenic is a secondary fungicide and insecticide, while chromium is a fixative which also provides ultraviolet (UV) light resistance. Recognized for the greenish tint it imparts to timber. this preservative was extremely popular for many decades until arsenic toxicity and carcinogenicity was recognized by the US EPA and other regulators.

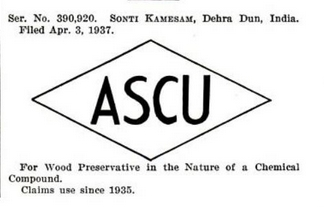
ASCU trademark issued by the USPTO.

Kamesam was born in Narsapur in West Godavari district of Andhra Pradesh and was a younger brother of S. V. Ramamurthy. After primary education at Visakhapatnam, he graduated from Presidency College, Chennai and obtained his B.E. from Guindy Engineering College. He also obtained an ME (honours) and became a Member of the Institution of Engineers (India). He joined in Forest Research Institute, Dehra Dun and later promoted as an Expert-in-charge of Wood Preservation. He was sent to Germany for research and worked with Richard Falck (1873-1955), a specialist on fungi and their damage to wood. They developed the 'Falkamesam arsenic-copper mixture' which was patented in Poland in 1932. Until then Wolman's formulation – famously known as Wolman Salts – contained dinitrophenol, a chemical manufactured by Hicksons, UK. In 1933, Kamesam added Copper sulphate as an anti-fungal to the formula of Wolman Salts which worked against termite damage. In addition Kamesam introduced the use of chromium to bind the two salts to the fibres of wood. He received an Indian patent in 1933, a British patent in 1934 and a US patent in 1938.

The application of the ASCU process for use in the Indian Railways was examined by a committee headed by Sir C.V. Raman in 1933-34. In 1936 he designed a highway bridge with a 60-foot span. In order to prove the strength of the bridge, he made two adult elephants, each weighing in at around ten tons, walk across while his children stood underneath.

After retirement Kamesam joined Tiruvankur estate as director of the development department. He built many bridges with his preserved wood. He was awarded an honorary D.Sc. by Andhra University for his contributions in 1939. He wrote a booklet on Construction of Better and cheaper highway bridges in 1943.
