= Paul Stäckel =

German mathematician

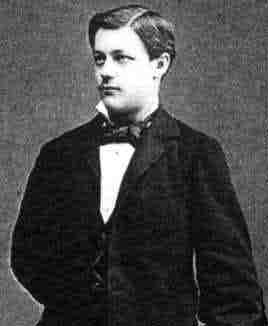
Paul Stäckel.

Paul Gustav Samuel Stäckel (20 August 1862, Berlin – 12 December 1919, Heidelberg) was a German mathematician, active in the areas of differential geometry, number theory, and non-Euclidean geometry. In the area of prime number theory, he used the term twin prime (in its German form, "Primzahlzwilling") for the first time.

After passing his Abitur in 1880 he studied mathematics and physics at the University of Berlin, but also listened to lectures on philosophy, psychology, education, and history. A year later he qualified for teaching in higher education and then taught at Gymnasien in Berlin. In 1885 he wrote his doctoral dissertation under Leopold Kronecker and Karl Weierstraß. In 1891 he completed his Habilitation at the University of Halle. Later he worked as a professor at the University of Königsberg (außerordentlicher Professor from 1895 to 1897), the University of Kiel (ordentlicher Professor, 1897 to 1905), University of Hannover (1905 to 1908), the Karlsruhe Institute of Technology (1908 to 1913), and the University of Heidelberg (1913 to 1919).

Stäckel worked on both mathematics and the history of mathematics. He edited the letters exchanged between Carl Friedrich Gauss and Wolfgang Bolyai, made contributions to editions of the collected works of Euler and Gauss (for whose works he wrote Gauss als Geometer), and edited the Geometrischen Untersuchungen by Wolfgang and Johann Bolyai (published in 1913). Additionally he translated works of Jacob Bernoulli, Johann Bernoulli, Augustin Louis Cauchy, Leonhard Euler, Joseph-Louis Lagrange, Adrien-Marie Legendre, Carl Gustav Jacobi from French and Latin into German for the series Ostwalds Klassiker der exakten Wissenschaften.

In 1904 he was an invited speaker at the International Congress of Mathematicians in Heidelberg. In 1905 he was the president of the Deutsche Mathematiker-Vereinigung. His doctoral students include Paul Riebesell.

== Works ==
- Über die Bewegung eines Punktes auf einer Fläche, 1885, Dissertation
- Die Integration der Hamilton-Jacobischen Differentialgleichung mittelst Separation der Variablen, 1891, Habilitation
- Elementare Dynamik der mathematischen Wissenschaft in: Encyclopädie der mathematischen Wissenschaft IV,1 (1908)
- several papers in the Mathematischen Annalen (from 1890 to 1909)
- numerous papers in "Nachrichten von der Gesellschaft der Wissenschaften zu Göttingen, Mathematisch-Physikalische Klasse" from 1896 to 1917.
- with Friedrich Engel: Theorie der Parallellinien von Euklid bis auf Gauss, 1895
