= Alfred Kneschke =

- Picture of Alfred Kneschke in his identity papers
- Born: 15 June 1902; Altlöbau
- Died: 24 November 1979 (aged 77); Freiberg
- Citizenship: German
- Education: TU Dresden
- Scientific career
- Fields: Mathematics; Logic
- Doctoral advisor: Georg Wiarda; Max Otto Lagally

Alfred Emil Richard Kneschke (15 June 1902 in Altlöbau – 24 November 1979 in Freiberg) was a German mathematician, engineer and university lecturer. During the World War II, Kneschke managed the Referat IV, Section II of the Wehrmacht Signals intelligence organization General der Nachrichtenaufklärung until November 1944, working on cryptanalysis and decoding of British, USA, French and Balkan cipher systems. From Nov 1944, he worked in the OKW/Chi cipher bureau as a cryptanalyst.

== Life ==
Kneschke came from a poor working family. In the Weimar Republic, undertaking study with little money was very difficult and required Kneschke to seek employment as well. In 1922, Kneschke, completed his seminary training as a primary school teacher and at the same time successfully passed the university-preparatory school leaving qualification, Abitur. After a four-year degree at TU Dresden, he graduated as an engineer in technical physics. In 1927, he was put forward by advisors Dr. Georg Wiarda and Max Otto Lagally for promotion to Dr. Phil in applied mathematics with a thesis titled: Application of the theory of integral equations to the impact problem of solid insulators (German:Anwendung der Theorie der Integralgleichungen auf das Durchschlagsproblem von festen Isolatoren). From 1926 to 1930 he was assistant to Max Otto Lagally. At the age of 27, he qualified as a lecturer at the Dresden University of Technology and passed the habilitation for the higher school office. In 1930 he went to work in the debt service, but at the same time taught as a lecturer at the TH Dresden, in 1938 he was awarded the title of professor extraordinarius. Kneschke was a teacher of mathematics and physics at the Higher School of Experiments in Dresden, then a mathematics lecturer at the Chemnitz University of Technology. He then headed the Oberrealschule in Meerane. In 1939 he was drafted. In 1945 he was released from the public service of Saxony in the course of denazification as a Nazi Party member. In 1945, he was dismissed from the debt service agency and the university service due to former Nazi Party membership. Between 1945 and 1949 he worked as an electrician FA. Geißler in Meerane. Between 1950 - 1951 Kneschke worked as a mathematical research assistant at VEB Carl Zeiss in Jena. On 1 November 1951 he was appointed as Professor with Chair of Technical Mechanics at the Faculty of Natural Sciences and Supplementary Courses of the Freiberg University of Mining and Technology and Director of the Institute for Applied Mathematics and Technical Mechanics.

In November 1933 he signed the vow of allegiance of the German professors to Adolf Hitler.

== Selected publications ==
- (With Horst Teichmann): Contribution to the systematic set-up of the analogies between linear equations systems and integral equations, Springer-Verlag, Zeitschrift für Physik, volume: 57, Ausgabe: 5-6, S.394-402, 1929
- Differential equations and boundary value problems, 3 volumes, Leipzig 1957, 1960 and 1962
- Technical Mechanics, with Dieter Rüdiger, 3 volumes, Leipzig 1960, 1962 and 1964
- Technical Mechanics for Mining, Metallurgy and Related Fields, (for the Fernstudium), 1952 ff.
