= Gustav Brandes =

German zoologist (1862–1941)

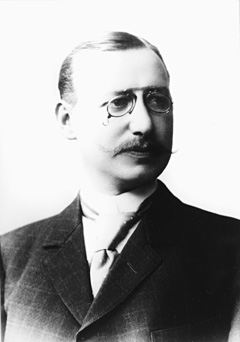

Gustav Philipp Hermann Brandes (2 May 1862 – 17 July 1941) was a German zoologist who specialized in parasitology. He became a professor of zoology at the University of Halle while also serving as director of Halle zoo in 1901 and from 1910 of the Dresden zoo. He was noted for his success in breeding apes, particularly orangutans.

Brandes was born at Schoningen near Helmstedt where his father Carl (1829-1905) worked as a cashier. He was in Freiburg for military service following which he began to study botany from 1884 and attend lectures by August Weismann. In 1886 he joined the University of Leipzig and received a doctorate in 1888 for a dissertation on the Holostomeae under Rudolf Leuckart. He then went to the zoological station in Naples before joining the University of Halle as a lecturer in 1889. His habilitation in 1891 included work on the morphology of trematodes. In 1896 he married Theodora, daughter of chemistry professor Volhardt. In 1902 he became a director of the newly founded zoological garden at Halle. He moved to Dresden zoo in 1910 and also taught veterinary medicine at Dresden University. Under his directorship, the Dresden zoo was the first to raise a new born orangutan in captivity. In 1933, he was a signatory to the Vow of allegiance of the Professors of the German Universities and High-Schools to Adolf Hitler and the National Socialistic State. His students called him "Papa Brandes" and he noted for warm-heartedness. Brandes resigned as zoo director in 1934.
