= Helmut Schultz =

German musicologist

Helmut Schultz (2 November 1904 – 13 April 1945) was a German musicologist at the University of Leipzig.

== Life ==
Schultz was born in Frankfurt, Son of the Reich Court Council Reinhold Schultz, he studied musicology, philosophy and philology at the University of Leipzig from 1923 to 1927. In 1930 he received his doctorate in musicology from Johann Vesque von Püttlingen. (1803-1883), in 1932 the habilitation for musicology on Das madrigal als Formideal. Eine stilkundliche Untersuchung mit Belegen aus dem Schaffen des Andrea Gabrieli. From 1928 to 1932 he was assistant, from 1932 to 1933 private lecturer, from 1933 to 1945 as successor of Theodor Kroyer. He then was professor of musicology at the University of Leipzig and director of the Musikinstrumentenmuseum as well as director of the Institute for Musicology of the University of Leipzig and the Saxon Research Institute for Musicology. From 1940 he was deputy chairman of the examination office for music. In 1943 he was suddenly drafted and died at the end of the war in 1945 in Waldenburg at the age of 40.

Like many of his colleagues, he signed the Vow of allegiance of the Professors of the German Universities and High-Schools to Adolf Hitler and the National Socialistic State in November 1933. However, Schultz was not a member of the NSDAP. At the time of the Musikwissenschaftliche Tagung 1938 Schultz formed in the Musicological Institute the antipole to the party comrades.

== Scientific activities ==
His manifold research interests were mainly in instrumentology and music history of the 16th to 18th century. He carried out extensive editorial work, including as director of the Haydn Complete Edition since 1929. Worthy of mention are works to propagate the activities of the Museum of Musical Instruments as well as practical musical activities, such as the founding of the student Collegia instrumentale and vocale, whose successes include performances of works from the 18th century.

== Publications ==
- Die Karl-Straube-Orgel des Musikwissenschaftlichen Instituts und Instrumenten-Museums der Universität Leipzig, Leipzig 1930.
- Instrumentenkunde, Leipzig 1931.
- Ludwig van Beethoven. Sein Leben in Bildern, Leipzig 1936.
- Giuseppe Verdi. Sein Leben in Bildern, Leipzig 1938.

== Literature ==
- Thomas Phleps: Ein stiller, verbissener und zäher Kampf um Stetigkeit – Musikwissenschaft in NS-Deutschland und ihre vergangenheitspolitische Bewältigung, Mainz 2001, pp. 471–488. online Uni Giessen
