= Adam Adrio =

German musicologist

Adam Adrio (4 April 1901 – 18 September 1973) was a German musicologist and college professor in Berlin.

== Leben ==
Born in Essen, from 1927 Adrio studierte musicology with Hermann Abert, Arnold Schering, Hans Joachim Moser and Friedrich Blume at the Humboldt University of Berlin. His dissertation of 1934/1935 is entitled Die Anfänge des geistlichen Konzerts. After a period as an assistant to Schering at the Music History Department in Berlin, he took over the Collegium musicum vocale of the university, where he became a professor in 1953, and taught at the Berlin Church Music School. He taught liturgy at the Protestant theological faculty.

In 1973 Adrio died in Klobenstein, South Tyrol at age 72.

== Work ==
Adrio was particularly active as an editor of Protestant church music works of the early baroque and baroque periods. He edited the St. Matthew Passion by Johann Georg Kühnhausen, worked on Johann Rudolph Ahle, Dietrich Buxtehude, Christoph Demantius, Johann Crüger, Melchior Franck, Tobias Michael, Johann Hermann Schein, Gottfried Heinrich Stölzel, Georg Philipp Telemann, but also on music of the 20th century, for example Ernst Pepping.

In 1937, together with Helmuth Osthoff and Walter Serauky he published the Festschrift for his teacher Arnold Schering. In the second half of the 20th century he wrote several essays in the Geschichte der evangelischen Kirchenmusik, which Friedrich Blume published in 1965. He also wrote numerous articles in the Musiklexikon Die Musik in Geschichte und Gegenwart (from 1949). For the large multi-volume collection of musical examples Das Musikwerk, he compiled the 19th volume on the topic "Fuge".

He also compiled biographies of musicians for the Neue Deutsche Biographie (NDB), which was published from 1953.
