= Friedrich Böhm =

German mathematician (1885–1965)

Friedrich Böhm (15 August 1885, Harburg (Swabia) near Donauwörth – 25 August 1965, Munich) was a German actuarial and insurance mathematician and university lecturer. During World War II, Böhm was conscripted into Group IV of Inspectorate 7 (German: Horchleistelle), an early cipher bureau and Signals intelligence agency of the German Army (Wehrmacht) (German: Heer), working to decode foreign Ciphers. He would later work in the successor organization: General der Nachrichtenaufklärung, in a similar role.

== Life ==
Friedrich Böhm studied mathematics at the Gymnasium St. Anna in Augsburg, Munich. In 1908, he undertook his promotion to Dr Phil with a thesis titled: Parabolic metric in the hyperbolic space. Lindemann, who had already given lectures on Actuarial mathematics in Munich, drew his attention to questions of mortality and disability. In 1911, he enabled Böhm's Habilitation in this discipline. Böhm became a private lecturer and, following the example of the University of Göttingen (Georg Bohlmann), founded a seminar on statistics and the insurance industry. During the 1911-12 winter term, he began delivering lectures on insurance mathematics. He had also taken the state exams as a teacher and was a student councillor. In 1920, he became an extraordinary professor of insurance mathematics at the Ludwig-Maximilians-Universität München, which he taught up to his retirement in 1955. He also taught other applications of mathematics in business.

He remained for a long time the only actuarial science mathematician at Ludwig-Maximilians-Universität München, and was only temporarily supported by the former director of Hamburger Feuerkasse, Paul Riebesell, who was appointed honorary professor in 1938 at the university. The successor of Böhm at the Ludwig-Maximilians-Universität München was Hans Richter, who in 1955 received an ordinariat (German: Lehrstuhl) for mathematical statistics and economic mathematics.

Böhm's two-volume textbook on actuarial science Versicherungsmathematik was widely disseminated.

== Bibliography ==
- Insurance Mathematics: Elements of the insurance bill (German:Versicherungsmathematik : Elemente der Versicherungsrechnung), Series:Sammlung Göschen, Bd. 180, 3. Aufl., Berlin 1953
- Actuarial Mathematics: Life Insurance Mathematics (German:Lebensversicherungsmathematik Einführung in die technischen Grundlagen der Sozialversicherung, aus: Versicherungsmathematik, 2), series:Sammlung Göschen, Bd. 917/917a, 2. Aufl., Berlin 1953
