= Erich Brandenburg =

German historian

Arnold Otto Erich Brandenburg
- Born: July 31, 1868; Stralsund, Prussia
- Died: January 22, 1946; Leipzig, Germany
- Occupation: Historian
- Known for: Die Reichsgründung (1916/1923)

Arnold Otto Erich Brandenburg (31 July 1868 in Stralsund – 22 January 1946 in Leipzig) was a German historian.

His main work Die Reichsgründung ("The Founding of the Reich", 2 vols. plus 1 vol. with documents) covers the origins of the modern German national movement and the founding of the Second Empire by Bismarck. The German historian Hans Herzfeld calls it "critical and reliable in its judgment" ("solide und kritisch zuverlässig im Urteil") and Herbert Helbig in Neue Deutsche Biographie "objective, deliberate and not without a critical attitude towards the problems of Bismarck's Empire" ("sachlich, kühl und nicht ohne kritische Einstellung zu der inneren Problematik des Bismarckreiches").

In 1933 Brandenburg signed the Vow of allegiance of the Professors of the German Universities and High-Schools to Adolf Hitler and the National Socialistic State.

== Literary works (selection) ==
- Die deutsche Revolution 1848, 1912 (online)
- Die Reichsgründung, 2 vols., 1916/1923 (online: volume 1 volume 2)
- Die materialistische Geschichtsauffasung, 1920
- Von Bismarck zum Weltkriege, 1924
  - From Bismarck to the World War: A History of German Foreign Policy 1870-1914. London: Oxford University Press. 1933. Archived from the original on March 19, 2017 – via Questia.
