= Walter Serauky =

German musicologist

Walter Karl August Serauky (20 April 1903 – 20 August 1959) was a German musicologist and Handel scholar.

== Life ==
Born in Halle (Saale), Serauky, a Lutheran, was the son of an insurance agent and a housewife. After his Abitur in 1922 at the Latina (Schule) of the Franckesche Stiftungen in Halle, he studied musicology as well as German language and literature, history and philosophy at the Martin-Luther-University Halle-Wittenberg and the University of Leipzig. From 1923 to 1933 he was a member of the Freie Volksbühne. In 1928 he received his doctorate from the Faculty of Philosophy of the University of Halle with the dissertation Die musikalische Nachahmungsästhetik im Zeitraum von 1700 bis 1850 (The Aesthetics of Musical Imitation from 1700 to 1850) under Arnold Schering and Max Schneider.

From 1928 to 1934, he was cultural and theater consultant for the liberal Vossische Zeitung in Berlin. From 1929 to 1932 he was also an extraordinary scientific assistant at the musicology department of the University of Halle. In 1932, he wrote his habilitation thesis on the "Music History of the City of Halle I". His Antrittsvorlesung (Inaugural Lecture) as Privatdozent dealt with the "nature and tasks of the sociology of music". The reviewers of the work were again Schering and Schneider.

In 1933 he joined the SA for a short time, which he left the same year for health reasons. In 1937 he became a member of the NSDAP. From 1938 he was also a NSV and NSLB member (until 1943); in 1941 he joined the NS-Dozentenbund. In 1940 he became extraordinary professor for musicology. While working on the third volume of Hallesche Musikgeschichte in 1941 he was called up for military service with the Landesschützen (Deutsches Reich) of the Wehrmacht, but was discharged as a disabled person the following year. In 1942 he became a full member of the State Institute for Music Research in Berlin. In 1943/44 he represented the professorship of Helmut Schultz at the Institute for Musicology of the University of Leipzig and the directorate at the Museum of Musical Instruments of Leipzig University as well as provisionally the artistic examination office. From August 1944 to January 1945 he was called up for the Volkssturm in Halle. According to the musicologist Eckehard Pistrick, "his role during the Nazi era must be viewed in a very differentiated manner". On the one hand, he would have been "burdened by the political opportunism typical of the time"; on the other hand, "his untiring personal commitment to musicology must also be emphasized".

At the end of 1945 the University of Halle dismissed him, probably because of his former NSDAP membership. In 1947 Serauky joined the FDGB. In 1945/46 he worked as librarian of the Musicology Department. He endeavoured to rehabilitate, which was made possible for him in 1946 by the "Democratic Block of the city of Halle". In 1946/47 he received a temporary research assignment on Georg Friedrich Händel. In 1948/49 he was a lecturer for musicology, propaedeutics, and modern music history at the University of Halle. In 1949 he was appointed professor with a chair and director of the musicological institute. His main areas of research were musicology, especially the music history of the city of Halle/Saale and Romanticism and realism in music.

From 1945 he was a member of the LDPD. In 1955 he became a member of the board of the Georg-Friedrich-Händel-Gesellschaft and in 1957 of the scientific advisory board for musicology at the Ministerium für das Hoch- und Fachschulwesen der DDR. He was also a member of the International Musicological Society in Basel.

== Publications ==
- Die musikalische Nachahmungsästhetik im Zeitraum von 1700 bis 1850. (1929)
- Musikgeschichte der Stadt Halle. (2 vol., 1935–1943)
- Samuel Scheidt in seinen Briefen. (1937)
- Halle als Musikstadt. (1954)
- Georg Friedrich Händel. Sein Leben – sein Werk. (5 vol., 1956–1958)

== Literature ==
- Gabriele Baumgartner: Serauky, Walter. In Gabriele Baumgartner, Dieter Hebig (edit.): Biographisches Handbuch der SBZ / DDR 1945–1990. Volume 2: Maassen – Zylla. Saur, Munich among others 1997, ISBN 3-598-11177-0, p. 862–863.
- Rudolf Eller, SL: Serauky, Walter. In Ludwig Finscher (ed.): Die Musik in Geschichte und Gegenwart. Second edition, personal section, volume 14 (Riccati – Schönstein). Bärenreiter/Metzler, Kassel among others 2005, ISBN 3-7618-1134-9 (Online-edition, subscription required for full access)
- Eckehard Pistrick: Musik und Musikwissenschaft in Halle 1933–1945. In Hallische Beiträge zur Zeitgeschichte (2003), issue 13, special issue, pp. 97–121, in particular pp. 105–109.
- Nicolas Slonimsky/Laura Kuhn/Dennis McIntire: "Serauky, Walter (Karl-August)." Baker's Biographical Dictionary of Musicians. Encyclopedia.com. 22 May 2018, Encyclopedia.com
