= Paul Riebesell =

Paul Louis Riebesell (9 June 1883, Hamburg – 16 March 1950, Hamburg) was a German mathematician, statistician, actuary, and president of Hamburger Feuerkasse. At the International Congress of Mathematicians, he was an invited speaker in 1932 in Zürich and in 1936 in Oslo.

== Biography ==
Riebesell studied mathematics and natural sciences at the Ludwig-Maximilians-Universität München, at the Friedrich Wilhelm University of Berlin, and at Kiel University, where he received his doctorate in 1905 under the supervision of Paul Stäckel. After receiving his doctorate, Riebesell was a Studienrat for a number of years at the University of Hamburg. In 1918, he became the second director of the Hamburg Jugendamt. He wrote a commentary on the Reichsgesetz für Jugendwohlfahrt (Youth Welfare Law). He published research on Einstein's theory of relativity. After he habilitated at the University of Hamburg, there at the beginning of the 1920s he was appointed an außerordentlicher Professor (non-tenured professor) in actuarial mathematics and remained in that position until 1934. In 1923, the city of Hamburg appointed him director of Hamburger Feuerkasse. In 1934, he was elected president of the Reichsverband des öffentlich-rechtlichen Versicherung (Reich Association of Public Insurance Companies). In 1937, he lost this position for political reasons. In 1938, he became the director of the life insurance company Isar Lebensversicherungs-AG with headquarters in Munich. He was also a professor honorarius from 1935 to 1940 at the Technische Hochschule Berlin (TH Berlin), from 1935 at the University of Berlin, and from 1938 at the Ludwig-Maximilians-Universität München. After WW II, he returned to Hamburg as president of Hamburger Feuerkasse and held that position until his death in 1950. In 1948, he co-founded the Deutsche Gesellschaft für Versicherungsmathematik (German Society for Actuarial Mathematics) and became its first chairman.

Riebesell dealt with the influence of currency devaluation on insurance benefits. His achievement in actuarial science lies primarily in the transfer of actuarial approaches from life insurance to property insurance. He published, with Rudolf Lencer, the textbook and reference book "Deutsche Versicherungswirtschaft" (6 vols., 1936–39).

During WWI, a thousand copies of Riebesell's booklet Mathematik im Krieg (Mathematics in war) were sent, free of charge, to the front.

Riebesell was a member of the NSDAP. He signed the Bekenntnis der Professoren an den Universitäten und Hochschulen zu Adolf Hitler und dem nationalsozialistischen Staat, which was published in November 1933.

In 1922, he married Elisabeth Lengstorf (1897–1976). They had two sons and four daughters.

== Selected publications ==
- Die mathematischen Grundlagen der Variations- und Vererbungslehre (1916)
- Mathematische Statistik und Biometrik (1932 & 1944)
- Mathematik des täglichen Lebens (1942, banned after 1945 in the Soviet Occupation Zone, & 1948)
- as co-editor: Handbuch der Versicherung (Hamburg 1938)
- Einführung in die Sachversicherungsmathematik (1936)
- Die Relativitätstheorie im Unterricht (1926)
- Über die geometrischen Deutungen der Relativitätstheorie, Mitteilungen der mathematischen Gesellschaft 5 (1914), pp. 130–140.
- Die Beweise für Relativitätstheorie, Naturwissenschaften 4 (1916), pp. 97–101. doi:10.1007/BF01509402
- Riebesell, P. (1918). "Die neueren Ergebnisse der theoretischen Physik und ihre Beziehungen zur Mathematik". Die Naturwissenschaften. 6 (6): 61–65. Bibcode:1918NW......6...61R. doi:10.1007/BF01506400. ISSN 0028-1042. S2CID 10906004.
- Mathematik im Krieg (1916)
- Photogrammetrie in der Schule (1914)

== Sources ==
- Wolfgang Poppelbaum: Paul Riebesell, In: Hamburgische Biografie. Personenlexikon, vol. 1, Hamburg 2001 pp. 252–254
