= Eduard Hermann (wrestler) =

Estonian wrestler (1891–1947)

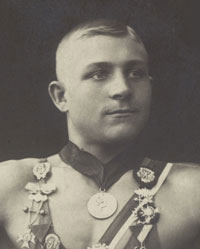

Personal information
- Born: 23 December 1891 Tartu, Governorate of Livonia, Russian Empire
- Died: 22 March 1947 (aged 55) Tartu, then part of Estonian SSR, Soviet Union
- Height: 172 cm (5 ft 8 in)
- Weight: 60–70 kg (132–154 lb)

Sport
- Sport: Greco-Roman wrestling
- Club: Tartu Kalev

Eduard Hermann (23 December 1891 – 22 March 1947) was an Estonian Greco-Roman wrestler. He took up wrestling in 1904, and placed sixth in the 60 kg division at the 1911 World Wrestling Championships representing Russian Empire. He won several Baltic championships and frequently competed in Finland.
