= Rose Stoppel =

German botanist

Rose Stoppel (26 December 1874 – 20 January 1970) was a German botanist and plant physiologist. She was the first female professor of botany in Germany.

== Life ==
Stoppel was born the youngest of seven siblings in East Prussia in 1874. She worked for 12 years as a domestic helper before completing an apprenticeship as horticulturalist and working for some time making botanical drawings. When Stoppel was age 29, her mother died, giving Rose her blessing to study. She acquired her abitur in Stuttgart in 1904, belonging to the first female graduating class at the school, and went on to study in Berlin, Strasbourg, Freiburg, and Basel.

In the same year as her graduation, Stoppel submitted a paper on the discovery of a microscopic fungus, eremascus fertilis Stoppel. She completed her doctorate - titled "Über din Einfluss des Lichts auf das Öffnen und Schliessen einiger Blüten" - in 1910 on the topic of the circadian rhythm of plants. Stoppel made a number of important observations and discoveries concluding that plants' biological clocks are endogenous, including through observations that a plant placed in a darkroom still behaved on a 24-hour cycle.

During the First World War, Stoppel worked as a bacteriologist for the Red Cross. Following an expedition to Iceland, for which she served as technical director, Stoppel submitted in 1924 her professorial work on the topic of plant behaviour during polar nights and extended summer days, being awarded her professorship in from the University of Hamburg and making her the first female professor of botany in Germany. In 1933, she signed the Vow of allegiance of the Professors of the German Universities and High-Schools to Adolf Hitler and the National Socialistic State.
