= Herbert Grundmann =

German historian of religion, medievalist and historian

Herbert Grundmann (February 14, 1902 - March 20, 1970) was a German historian, soldier and professor who was the editorial director of the Monumenta Germaniae Historica.

== Education ==
Grundmann was born in 1902 in Meerane, Saxony, and grew up in Chemnitz, Saxony. After graduating from high school in 1921, he enrolled in the University of Leipzig. He first majored in political economy, thinking he would take over his father's factory. After several exchange semesters at Heidelberg and Munich, he decided to specialize in medieval history. He wrote his dissertation under Walter Goetz in Leipzig, the topic being Joachim of Fiore. Grundmann's doctoral thesis was finished in 1926, less than two years after beginning, and earned him his degree summa cum laude.

For his Habilitation (1926–1928), Grundmann continued editing the works of Joachim of Fiore and studying the Joachite prophetic tradition. In the same period, he published six path-breaking articles.

While in university, Grundmann worked as an editor of the edition of writings associated with the Augsburg Diet of 1530. His Habilitation was finished in 1933, it was accepted at Leipzig and was later published in English as Religious Movements in the Middle Ages in 1935.

== University posts ==
In March 1933, Grundmann signed a statement pledging support to the National-Socialist regime in Germany. However, he never joined any Nazi organization and avoided public activism and opportunism. Since Grundmann's academic patron, Walter Goetz, had served as a legislator during the Weimar Republic for a leftist party, Grundmann was blacklisted from academic positions.

Grundmann married in 1937 and eventually fathered three children. He finally obtained a position in 1939 at the University of Königsberg.

He joined the Wehrmacht in 1942 and worked at a desk job before being sent to officer training school in 1943. He moved to Münster in Westphalia in summer 1944, together with his family, to take a job as professor. In winter 1945, Grundmann was assigned to an anti-tank unit in East Prussia. He was wounded in the left wrist in February 1945 and sent for recuperation behind the lines. He was taken prison by the British Army in Wismar and released in July 1945, returning to Münster.

Grundmann was professor of medieval history at Münster until 1958. His most influential article was "Litteratus-Illiteratus: The Transformation of an Educational Standard from Antiquity to the Middle Ages". He also oversaw a new edition of the famous Gebhardt, a multi-volume handbook of German history. His work on medieval hermits and ascetics living outside of monasteries was groundbreaking.

=== Memberships in learned societies ===
He was a member the Academies of Science at Göttingen, Leipzig and Munich. Outside Germany, his accomplishments were honored by membership in the Académie des Inscriptions et Belles-Lettres (Institut de France), the Société des Bollandistes in Brussels, the Austrian Academy of Sciences in Vienna and the Accademia dei Lincei in Rome.

== Monumenta Germaniae Historica ==
In 1959, Grundmann became the president of the Monumenta Germaniae Historica, a prestigious series of carefully edited and published sources for the study of European history. He worked there until his death in 1970.

== Works ==
- Ausgewählte Aufsätze (= Schriften der Monumenta Germaniae Historica. Bd. 25). 3 Bände. Hiersemann, Stuttgart 1976–1978, ISBN 3-7772-7613-8
  - Volume 1: Religiöse Bewegungen 1976, ISBN 3-7772-7614-6
  - Volume 2: Joachim von Fiore. 1977, ISBN 3-7772-7702-9
  - Volume 3: Bildung und Sprache. 1978, ISBN 3-7772-7803-3
- Geschichtsschreibung im Mittelalter. Gattungen – Epochen – Eigenart. Vandenhoeck & Ruprecht, Göttingen 1965 (= Kleine Vandenhoeck-Reihe. Bd. 209/210, ZDB-ID 255845–2). (4. Auflage. (= Kleine Vandenhoeck-Reihe. Bd. 1209). ebenda 1987, ISBN 3-525-33224-6. Digitalisat (BSB Digi 20))
- Religiöse Bewegungen im Mittelalter. Untersuchungen über die geschichtlichen Zusammenhänge zwischen der Ketzerei, den Bettelorden und der religiösen Frauenbewegung im 12. und 13. Jahrhundert und über die geschichtlichen Grundlagen der Deutschen Mystik (= Historische Studien. Bd. 267, ZDB-ID 514152–7). Ebering, Berlin 1935 (Zugleich: Leipzig, Universität, Habilitations-Schrift, 1933), (Sonderausgabe. Reprografischer Nachdruck, 4., unveränderte Auflage. Wissenschaftliche Buchgesellschaft, Darmstadt 1977).

== Secondary sources ==
- Heinrich Appelt (1970). "Herbert Grundmann". Almanach der österreichischen Akademie der Wissenschaften (in German). 120: 391–394. ISSN 0078-3447.
- Friedrich Baethgen (1970). "Herbert Grundmann 14.2.1902 – 20.3.1970". Jahrbuch der Bayerischen Akademie der Wissenschaften (in German): 214–223. ISSN 0084-6090. (online)
- Arno Borst (1970). "Herbert Grundmann (1902–1970)". Deutsches Archiv für Erforschung des Mittelalters (in German). 26: 27–353. (online).
- Hermann Heimpel (1970). "Herbert Grundmann †". Historische Zeitschrift (in German). 211: 781–786. doi:10.1524/hzhz.1970.211.jg.781. S2CID 165088681.
- Hermann Heimpel (1972). "Herbert Grundmann". Jahrbuch Sächsische Akademie der Wissenschaften zu Leipzig (in German). 1969/70. Berlin: 377–380.
- Hermann Heimpel (1995). "Herbert Grundmann Rede zur Trauerfeier am 25. März 1970 im Krematorium des Ostfriedhofs in München". In Sabine Krüger (ed.). Aspekte. Alte und neue Texte (in German). Göttingen: Wallstein-Verlag. pp. 224–227. ISBN 3-89244-095-6.
- Fritz Wagner (1970). "Herbert Grundmann 14.2.1902 – 20.3.1970". Archiv für Kulturgeschichte (in German). 52: 1–3. doi:10.7788/akg.1970.52.1.1. ISSN 0003-9233. S2CID 183409683.
