= Eduard Hermann (linguist) =

German linguist

- Born: 19 December 1869; Coburg, Kingdom of Bavaria
- Died: 14 February 1950 (aged 80); Göttingen, West Germany
- Scientific career
- Thesis: (1893)
- Doctoral advisor: Berthold Delbrück

Eduard Hermann (19 December 1869 – 14 February 1950) was a German linguist known for his comparative studies of Indo-European languages.

Hermann studied in Leipzig, Freiburg and Jena and defended his PhD in 1893 under Berthold Delbrück. After that he worked at various schools in Coburg and Bergedorf; in 1913 he became an associate professor at the University of Kiel, and in 1914 a full professor in Frankfurt. In 1917 he succeeded Jacob Wackernagel at the University of Göttingen. His work mainly focused on Baltic and Greek languages, and on Homer in particular. He also published some works on language acquisition by children.
