= Sparassol =

Names
- Preferred IUPAC name Methyl 2-hydroxy-4-methoxy-6-methylbenzoate
- Other names: Methyl everninate; Methyl 4-methoxy-6-methylsalicylate; Methyl 3-hydroxy-5-methoxy-2-toluate

Identifiers
CAS Number	520-43-4
3D model (JSmol)	Interactive image
ChEBI	CHEBI:92544
ChEMBL	ChEMBL1595401
ChemSpider	518393
PubChem CID	596344
UNII	49LGW9K0EH
CompTox Dashboard (EPA)	DTXSID901028412
- InChI: InChI=1S/C10H12O4/c1-6-4-7(13-2)5-8(11)9(6)10(12)14-3/h4-5,11H,1-3H3 Key: PFVPJOAAHSOENR-UHFFFAOYSA-N
- SMILES: CC1=CC(=CC(=C1C(=O)OC)O)OC

Properties
Chemical formula	C_{10}H_{12}O_{4}
Molar mass	196.202 g·mol^{−1}
- Except where otherwise noted, data are given for materials in their standard state (at 25 °C [77 °F], 100 kPa). Infobox references

Sparassol is an antibiotic and antifungal isolated from Sparassis crispa.
