= Felix Krueger =

German psychologist and professor (1874–1948)

- Born: 10 August 1874; Posen, German Empire
- Died: 25 February 1948 (aged 73); Basel, Switzerland
- Scientific career
- Fields: Psychology
- Workplaces: University of Leipzig

Felix Krueger (or Krüger) (10 August 1874 in Posen – 25 February 1948 in Basel) was a German psychologist and philosopher. He was a student of Wilhelm Wundt (who is regarded as the father of psychology).

From 1912 to 1913, Krueger was an exchange professor at Columbia University and after returning to Germany in 1917, he succeeded Wundt at the University of Leipzig, where he founded the second Leipzig school of psychology, whose principles were based on a genetic psychology of wholeness and structure (genetische Ganzheits- und Strukturpsychologie).

His most noteworthy achievement is "Das Wesen der Gefühle", Leipzig 1928, (translated as "The Essence of Feeling", Worcester, MA: Clark University Press, 1928)

In 1929 he belonged to the founding members of Alfred Rosenberg's Militant League for German Culture.

When the Nazis seized power in 1933 Krueger wrote: “This is not only about the future of Germany. Ethics and thus the life of the white race are at stake.”

The Nazi authorities eventually later found out that his grandfather was a "full-blooded Jew."
