= Thomas Phleps =

German guitarist and musicologist (1955–2017)

Thomas Phleps (2 September 1955 – 5 June 2017) was a German guitarist and musicologist.

== Life ==
Born in Bad Hersfeld, Phleps studieded at the Philipps-Universität Marburg and the University of Kassel and completed his studies in 1981 and 1983 respectively with state examinations for the teaching profession in the subjects music, German and philosophy.

Since 1983, he has been a lecturer for musicology and guitar in Kassel. He received his doctorate in 1987 with the work Hanns Eisler's "Deutsche Sinfonie". A contribution to the aesthetics of resistance.

Initially, Phleps worked as a stage musician at the Staatstheater Kassel. Since 1989, he worked as a teacher in Bad Arolsen. In 1995, he was appointed to the University of Giessen. In 2000, he habilitated there in the fields of musicology and music education. From 2001 to 2003, he was professor for music education at the University of Bremen, and since 2003 in Gießen.

From 2010, Phleps was the editor-in-chief of the Hanns Eisler Complete Edition.

Pfleps died on 5 June 2017 at the age of 61 in Kassel of a heart attack.

== Publications ==
- Hanns Eislers "Deutsche Sinfonie". Ein Beitrag zur Ästhetik des Widerstands (Kasseler Schriften zur Musik 1). Kassel: Bärenreiter 1988, 389 pages.
- Zwischen Spätklassik und Hip-Hop – Methoden und Modelle. Musikanalytische, musikhistorische und musikdidaktische Studien. 2000.
- Zwischen Adorno and Zappa. Semantische und funktionale Inszenierungen in der Musik des 20. Jahrhunderts (Zwischen/Töne. Neue Folge 1). Berlin: Weidler Buchverlag 2001, 350 pages
- Mein bester Freund in der populären Musik. Nachricht von den neuesten Schicksalen des lauten Schalls im deutschsprachigen Raum. Karben: Coda 2002, pages 94.
