= List of probability topics =

This is a list of probability topics. It overlaps with the (alphabetical) list of statistical topics. There are also the outline of probability and catalog of articles in probability theory. For distributions, see List of probability distributions. For journals, see list of probability journals. For contributors to the field, see list of mathematical probabilists and list of statisticians.

== General aspects ==
- Probability
- Randomness, Pseudorandomness, Quasirandomness
- Randomization, hardware random number generator
- Random number generation
- Random sequence
- Uncertainty
- Statistical dispersion
- Observational error
- Equiprobable
  - Equipossible
- Average
- Probability interpretations
- Markovian
- Statistical regularity
- Central tendency
- Bean machine
- Relative frequency
- Frequency probability
- Maximum likelihood
- Bayesian probability
- Principle of indifference
- Credal set
- Cox's theorem
- Principle of maximum entropy
- Information entropy
- Urn problems
- Extractor
- Free probability
- Exotic probability
- Schrödinger method
- Empirical measure
- Glivenko–Cantelli theorem
- Zero–one law
  - Kolmogorov's zero–one law
  - Hewitt–Savage zero–one law
- Law of truly large numbers
  - Littlewood's law
  - Infinite monkey theorem
- Littlewood–Offord problem
- Inclusion–exclusion principle
- Impossible event
- Information geometry
- Talagrand's concentration inequality

== Foundations of probability theory ==
- Probability theory
- Probability space
  - Sample space
  - Standard probability space
  - Random element
    - Random compact set
  - Dynkin system
- Probability axioms
- Normalizing constant
- Event (probability theory)
  - Complementary event
- Elementary event
- Mutually exclusive
- Boole's inequality
- Probability density function
- Cumulative distribution function
- Law of total cumulance
- Law of total expectation
- Law of total probability
- Law of total variance
- Almost surely
- Cox's theorem
- Bayesianism
- Prior probability
- Posterior probability
- Borel's paradox
- Bertrand's paradox
- Coherence (philosophical gambling strategy)
- Dutch book
- Algebra of random variables
- Belief propagation
- Transferable belief model
- Dempster–Shafer theory
- Possibility theory

== Random variables ==
- Discrete random variable
  - Probability mass function
- Constant random variable
- Expected value
  - Jensen's inequality
- Variance
  - Standard deviation
  - Geometric standard deviation
- Multivariate random variable
  - Joint probability distribution
  - Marginal distribution
  - Kirkwood approximation
- Independent identically-distributed random variables
  - Independent and identically-distributed random variables
- Statistical independence
  - Conditional independence
  - Pairwise independence
  - Covariance
  - Covariance matrix
  - De Finetti's theorem
- Correlation
  - Uncorrelated
  - Correlation function
- Canonical correlation
- Convergence of random variables
  - Weak convergence of measures
    - Helly–Bray theorem
    - Slutsky's theorem
  - Skorokhod's representation theorem
  - Lévy's continuity theorem
  - Uniform integrability
- Markov's inequality
- Chebyshev's inequality = Chernoff bound
- Chernoff's inequality
- Bernstein inequalities (probability theory)
  - Hoeffding's inequality
- Kolmogorov's inequality
- Etemadi's inequality
- Chung–Erdős inequality
- Khintchine inequality
- Paley–Zygmund inequality
- Laws of large numbers
  - Asymptotic equipartition property
  - Typical set
  - Law of large numbers
  - Kolmogorov's two-series theorem
- Random field
  - Conditional random field
- Borel–Cantelli lemma
- Wick product

== Conditional probability ==
- Conditioning (probability)
- Conditional expectation
- Conditional probability distribution
- Regular conditional probability
- Disintegration theorem
- Bayes' theorem
- de Finetti's theorem
  - Exchangeable random variables
- Rule of succession
- Conditional independence
- Conditional event algebra
  - Goodman–Nguyen–van Fraassen algebra

== Theory of probability distributions ==
- Probability distribution
- Probability distribution function
- Probability density function
- Probability mass function
- Cumulative distribution function
- Quantile
- Moment (mathematics)
  - Moment about the mean
  - Standardized moment
    - Skewness
    - Kurtosis
    - Locality
  - Cumulant
  - Factorial moment
  - Expected value
    - Law of the unconscious statistician
  - Second moment method
  - Variance
    - Coefficient of variation
    - Variance-to-mean ratio
  - Covariance function
  - An inequality on location and scale parameters
  - Taylor expansions for the moments of functions of random variables
  - Moment problem
    - Hamburger moment problem
      - Carleman's condition
    - Hausdorff moment problem
    - Trigonometric moment problem
    - Stieltjes moment problem
- Prior probability distribution
- Total variation distance
- Hellinger distance
- Wasserstein metric
- Lévy–Prokhorov metric
  - Lévy metric
- Continuity correction
- Heavy-tailed distribution
- Truncated distribution
- Infinite divisibility
- Stability (probability)
- Indecomposable distribution
- Power law
- Anderson's theorem
- Probability bounds analysis
- Probability box

== Properties of probability distributions ==
- Central limit theorem
  - Illustration of the central limit theorem
  - Concrete illustration of the central limit theorem
  - Berry–Esséen theorem
  - Berry–Esséen theorem
  - De Moivre–Laplace theorem
  - Lyapunov's central limit theorem
  - Misconceptions about the normal distribution
  - Martingale central limit theorem
  - Infinite divisibility (probability)
  - Method of moments (probability theory)
  - Stability (probability)
  - Stein's lemma
- Characteristic function (probability theory)
  - Lévy continuity theorem
- Darmois–Skitovich theorem
- Edgeworth series
- Helly–Bray theorem
- Kac–Bernstein theorem
- Location parameter
- Maxwell's theorem
- Moment-generating function
  - Factorial moment generating function
- Negative probability
- Probability-generating function
- Vysochanskiï–Petunin inequality
- Mutual information
- Kullback–Leibler divergence
- Le Cam's theorem
- Large deviations theory
  - Contraction principle (large deviations theory)
  - Varadhan's lemma
  - Tilted large deviation principle
  - Rate function
  - Laplace principle (large deviations theory)
  - Exponentially equivalent measures
  - Cramér's theorem (second part)

== Applied probability ==
- Empirical findings
  - Benford's law
  - Pareto principle
  - Zipf's law
- Boy or Girl paradox

== Stochastic processes ==
- Adapted process
- Basic affine jump diffusion
- Bernoulli process
  - Bernoulli scheme
- Branching process
- Point process
- Chapman–Kolmogorov equation
- Chinese restaurant process
- Coupling (probability)
- Ergodic theory
  - Maximal ergodic theorem
  - Ergodic (adjective)
- Galton–Watson process
- Gauss–Markov process
- Gaussian process
  - Gaussian random field
  - Gaussian isoperimetric inequality
  - Large deviations of Gaussian random functions
- Girsanov's theorem
- Hawkes process
- Increasing process
- Itô's lemma
- Jump diffusion
- Law of the iterated logarithm
- Lévy flight
- Lévy process
- Loop-erased random walk
- Markov chain
  - Examples of Markov chains
  - Detailed balance
  - Markov property
  - Hidden Markov model
  - Maximum-entropy Markov model
  - Markov chain mixing time
- Markov partition
- Markov process
  - Continuous-time Markov process
  - Piecewise-deterministic Markov process
- Martingale
  - Doob martingale
  - Optional stopping theorem
  - Martingale representation theorem
  - Azuma's inequality
  - Wald's equation
- Poisson process
  - Poisson random measure
- Population process
- Process with independent increments
- Progressively measurable process
- Queueing theory
  - Erlang unit
- Random walk
- Random walk Monte Carlo
- Renewal theory
- Skorokhod's embedding theorem
- Stationary process
- Stochastic calculus
  - Itô calculus
  - Malliavin calculus
  - Stratonovich integral
- Time series analysis
  - Autoregressive model
  - Moving average model
  - Autoregressive moving average model
  - Autoregressive integrated moving average model
  - Anomaly time series
- Voter model
- Wiener process
  - Brownian motion
  - Geometric Brownian motion
  - Donsker's theorem
  - Empirical process
  - Wiener equation
  - Wiener sausage

== Geometric probability ==
- Buffon's needle
- Integral geometry
- Hadwiger's theorem
- Wendel's theorem

== Gambling ==
- Luck
- Game of chance
- Odds
- Gambler's fallacy
- Inverse gambler's fallacy
- Parrondo's paradox
- Pascal's wager
- Gambler's ruin
- Poker probability
  - Poker probability (Omaha)
  - Poker probability (Texas hold 'em)
  - Pot odds
- Roulette
  - Martingale (betting system)
  - The man who broke the bank at Monte Carlo
- Lottery
  - Lottery machine
  - Pachinko
- Coherence (philosophical gambling strategy)
- Coupon collector's problem

== Coincidence ==
- Birthday paradox
  - Birthday problem
- Index of coincidence
- Bible code
- Spurious relationship
- Monty Hall problem

== Algorithmics ==
- Probable prime
- Probabilistic algorithm = Randomised algorithm
- Monte Carlo method
- Las Vegas algorithm
- Probabilistic Turing machine
- Stochastic programming
- Probabilistically checkable proof
- Box–Muller transform
- Metropolis algorithm
- Gibbs sampling
- Inverse transform sampling method
- Walk-on-spheres method

== Financial mathematics ==
- Risk
- Value at risk
- Market risk
- Risk-neutral measure
- Volatility
- SWOT analysis (Marketing)
- Kelly criterion

== Genetics ==
- Punnett square
- Hardy–Weinberg principle
- Ewens's sampling formula
- Population genetics

== Historical ==
- History of probability
- The Doctrine of Chances
