= Jürgen Gärtner =

German mathematician

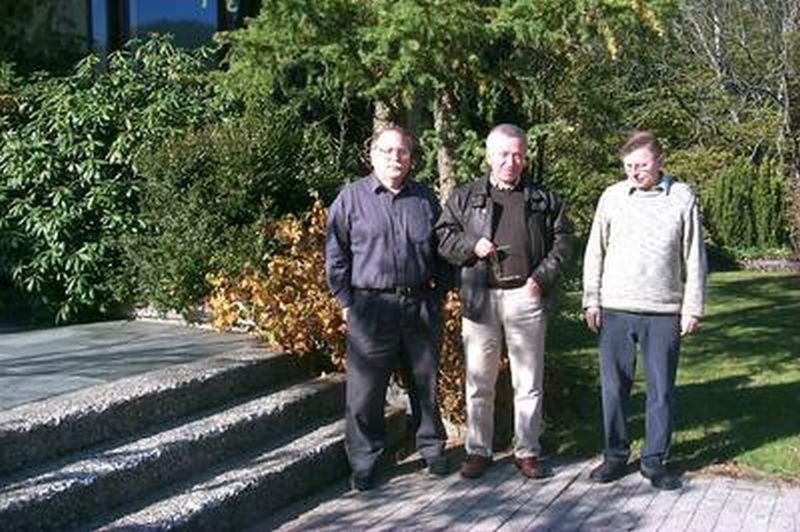
From left: Charles Newman, Stanislav Molchanov, Jürgen Gärtner, Oberwolfach 2003

Jürgen Gärtner (born 1950) is a German mathematician, specializing in probability theory and analysis.

== Biography ==
Gärtner was born in 1950 in Reichenbach. He graduated in 1973 with Diplom from TU Dresden. He received in 1976 his Ph.D. from Lomonosov University under the supervision of Mark Freidlin. At the Weierstrass Institute, Gärtner was from 1976 to 1985 a research associate; he habilitated there in 1984 with Dissertation B: Zur Ausbreitung von Wellenfronten für Reaktions-Diffusions-Gleichungen (The propagation of wave fronts for reaction-diffusion equations). At the Weierstrass Institute he was from 1985 to 1995 the head of the probability group. He was a professor of the Academy of Sciences of the GDR from 1988 until its disbandment in late 1991. At TU Berlin he was from 1992 to 2011 a professor, retiring as professor emeritus in 2011.

In 1977 he proved a general form of Cramér's Theorem in the theory of large deviations (LD); the theorem is known as the Gärtner-Ellis Large Deviations Principle (LDP). (Richard S. Ellis proved the theorem in 1984 with weaker premises.) In 1982 Gärtner wrote an important paper on the famous KPP equation (a semi-linear diffusion equation introduced in 1937). In 1987 Gärtner, with Donald A. Dawson, introduced the construction of a projective limit in the LDP. From 1987 to 1989 Gärtner and Dawson wrote a series of important papers on the McKean-Vlasov process. Their results were extended by other mathematicians in the 1990s to random mean-field interactions and to spin-glass mean-field interactions. In 1990 Gärtner and Molchanov wrote a seminal paper on intermittency in the parabolic Anderson model; the paper introduced a new approach to intermittency via the study of Lyapunov coefficients.

Gärtner was a member from 1984 to 1992 of the editorial board of Probability Theory and Related Fields and from 1990 to 2000 of the editorial board of Mathematische Nachrichten.

In 1992 Gärtner was an invited lecturer at the first European Congress of Mathematics in Paris. In 1994 he was an invited speaker with talk Parabolic Systems in Random Media and Aspects of Intermittency at the International Congress of Mathematicians in Zürich. A conference was held in honor of his 60th birthday.

== Selected publications ==
- Gärtner, Jürgen (1977). "On Large Deviations from the Invariant Measure". Theory of Probability & Its Applications. 22: 24–39. doi:10.1137/1122003.
- Gärtner, Jürgen (1982). "Location of Wave Fronts for the Multi-Dimensional K-P-P Equation and Brownian First Exit Densities". Mathematische Nachrichten. 105 (1): 317–351. doi:10.1002/mana.19821050117. ISSN 0025-584X.
- Fleischmann, Klaus; Gärtner, Jürgen (1986). "Occupation Time Processes at a Critical Point". Mathematische Nachrichten. 125: 275–290. doi:10.1002/mana.19861250121.
- Gärtner, Jürgen (1987). "Convergence towards Burger's equation and propagation of chaos for weakly asymmetric exclusion processes". Stochastic Processes and Their Applications. 27: 233–260. doi:10.1016/0304-4149(87)90040-8.
- Dawsont, Donald A.; Gärtner, Jürgen (1987). "Large deviations from the mckean-vlasov limit for weakly interacting diffusions". Stochastics. 20 (4): 247–308. doi:10.1080/17442508708833446. S2CID 122536900.
- Dawson, D.A.; Gärtner, J. (1987). "Long-time fluctuations of weakly interacting diffusions". In Engelbert, H. J.; Schmidt, W. (eds.). Stochastic Differential Systems. Lecture Notes in Control and Information Systems, vol. 96. Vol. 96. Springer. pp. 3–10. doi:10.1007/BFb0038915. ISBN 3-540-18010-9.
- Dawson, D.A.; Gärtner, J. (1988). "Long-time behaviour of interacting diffusions". In J.R. Norris (ed.). Stochastic Calculus in Application: Symposium Proceedings (Cambridge UK, Spring 1987). Pitman Research Notes in Mathematics. Longman. pp. 29–54.
- Gärtner, Jürgen (1988). "On the Mc Kean-Vlasov Limit for Interacting Diffusions". Mathematische Nachrichten. 137: 197–248. doi:10.1002/mana.19881370116.
- Dawson, Donald Andrew; Gärtner, J. (1989). Large Deviations, Free Energy Functional and Quasi-Potential for a Mean Field Model of Interacting Diffusions. American Mathematical Soc. ISBN 9780821824610.
- Gärtner, J.; Molchanov, S. A. (1990). "Parabolic problems for the Anderson model". Communications in Mathematical Physics. 132 (3): 613–655. doi:10.1007/BF02156540. S2CID 120557758.
- Gärtner, J.; Den Hollander, F. (1999). "Correlation structure of intermittency in the parabolic Anderson model". Probability Theory and Related Fields. 114: 1–54. doi:10.1007/s004400050220. hdl:1887/63147. S2CID 56023530.
- Gärtner, Jürgen; König, Wolfgang (2000). "Moment Asymptotics for the Continuous Parabolic Anderson Model". The Annals of Applied Probability. 10 (1): 192–217. doi:10.1214/aoap/1019737669. JSTOR 2667192.
- Gärtner, J.; König, W.; Molchanov, S.A. (2000). "Almost sure asymptotics for the continuous parabolic Anderson model". Probability Theory and Related Fields. 118 (4): 547–573. doi:10.1007/PL00008754. S2CID 120936569.
- Gärtner, Jürgen; König, Wolfgang (2005). "The Parabolic Anderson Model". Interacting Stochastic Systems. pp. 153–179. doi:10.1007/3-540-27110-4_8. ISBN 3-540-23033-5. S2CID 17389137.
- Gärtner, J.; Den Hollander, F. (2006). "Intermittency in a catalytic random medium". The Annals of Probability. 34 (6): 2219–2287. arXiv:math/0406266. doi:10.1214/009117906000000467.
- Gärtner, Jürgen; König, Wolfgang; Molchanov, Stanislav (2007). "Geometric characterization of intermittency in the parabolic Anderson model". The Annals of Probability. 35 (2): 439–499. arXiv:math/0507585. doi:10.1214/009117906000000764.

== See also ==
- Dawson–Gärtner theorem
- Mean-field particle methods
