= Markov =

Markov (Cyrillic: Марков) is a Slavic masculine surname. Its feminine counterpart is Markova, and Markoff is a gender-neutral form. Markova is also a feminine version of another Slavic surname Marek. Notable people with the name include:

== Academics ==
- Ivana Markova (1938–2024), Czechoslovak-British emeritus professor of psychology at the University of Stirling
- Igor Markov (born 1973), American professor, computer scientist and engineer
- John Markoff (sociologist) (born 1942), American professor of sociology and history at the University of Pittsburgh
- Konstantin Markov (1905–1980), Soviet geomorphologist and quaternary geologist

== Mathematics, science, and technology ==
- Alexander V. Markov (born 1965), Russian biologist
- Andrey Markov (1856–1922), Russian mathematician
- Andrey Markov Jr. (1903–1979), Russian mathematician and son of Andrey Markov
- Elena Vladimirovna Markova (1923–2023), Soviet and Russian cyberneticist, Doctor of Technical Sciences, gulag convict and memoirist.
- John Markoff (born 1949), American journalist of computer industry and technology
- Moisey Markov (1908–1994), Russian physicist
- Vladimir Andreevich Markov (1871–1897), Russian mathematician, brother of Andrey Markov (Sr.)

== Performing arts ==
- Albert Markov (born 1933), Russian American violinist, composer
- Alexander Markov (born 1963), current Russian American violinist
- Dame Alicia Markova (1910–2004), British prima ballerina
- Margaret Markov (born 1951), Yugoslav-American actress of film and television
- Rimma Markova (1925–2015), Soviet and Russian actress
- Zuzana Marková (soprano) (born 1988), Czech soprano

== Politicians ==
- Helmuth Markov (born 1952), German politician and Member of the European Parliament
- Nikolai Yevgenyevich Markov (1866–1945), Russian right-wing politician
- Sergey Alexandrovich Markov (born 1958), Russian political scientist, nationalist politician
- Vladimir Ivanovich Markov (1859–1919), Russian politician, last Minister-Secretary of State for Finland in Czarist regime

== Athletes ==
- Alexei Markov (born 1979), Russian road bicycle racer
- Andrei Markov (ice hockey) (born 1978), Russian ice hockey player in the NHL
- Danny Markov (born 1976), professional ice hockey player for CSKA Moscow
- Dmitri Markov (born 1975), Belarusian pole vaulter representing Australia
- Dragomir Markov (born 1971), Bulgarian swimmer
- Georgi Markov (footballer) (born 1972), Bulgarian footballer
- Georgi Markov (weightlifter) (born 1978), Bulgarian weightlifter
- Georgi Markov (wrestler) (born 1946), Bulgarian wrestler
- Khristo Markov (born 1965), Bulgarian triple jumper
- Ilona Markova (born 2002), Russian ice hockey player
- Ilya Markov (born 1972), Russian race walker
- Ivaylo Markov (born 1997), Bulgarian footballer
- Marko Markov (born 1981), Bulgarian footballer
- Miglena Markova (born 1983), Bulgarian rower
- Nikolay Markov (footballer) (born 1985), Russian footballer
- Oleg Markov (born 1996), Australian rules footballer
- Olga Markova (athlete) (born 1968), Russian long-distance runner
- Olga Markova (figure skater) (born 1974), Russian figure skater

== Other fields ==
- Georgi Markov (1929–1978), Bulgarian dissident writer assassinated in London
- Philip Markoff (1986–2010), defendant in a murder case known as the "Craigslist killing"
- Sergey Markov (1878–1918), Russian army general, anti-Bolshevik during Soviet civil war
- Walterina Markova (Walter Dempster), Philippine drag queen and World War II sex slave

== Fictional characters ==
- Brion Markov, name of comic book character Geo-Force
- Tara Markov, name of comic book character Terra
- Frantisek Markov, Dungeons & Dragons character
- Sorin Markov, character from Magic: The Gathering storyline
- Ronan Markov, book character from The Darkest Temptation

== See also ==
- Surnames derived from the name Mark
- Eufrosina Dvoichenko-Markov, Soviet KGB spy in New York City during World War II
- Markov (crater), lunar impact crater that is located in the northwestern part of the Moon's near side
- 27514 Markov, a main-belt asteroid named after Andrey A. Markov
- Markov chain, a mathematical process useful for statistical modeling
- Markov random field, a set of random variables having a Markov property described by an undirected graph
- Markov's inequality, a probabilistic upper bound
- Markovian (disambiguation)
- Markovo (disambiguation)
