= Richard S. Ellis =

American mathematician

Richard Steven Ellis
- Education: University of Massachusetts Amherst
- Known for: Gärtner-Ellis theorem
- Scientific career
- Fields: Probability theory, Large deviations theory
- Thesis: Chapman-Eskog-Hilbert Expansion for Models of the Boltzmann Equation (1972)
- Doctoral advisor: Henry McKean

Richard Steven Ellis (May 15, 1947 – July 2, 2018) was an American mathematician.

Ellis was born on May 15, 1947, in Brookline, Massachusetts, to parents Murray and Helen. Ellis graduated from Boston Latin School and attended Harvard University, where he studied German literature and mathematics. He pursued graduate study at the Courant Institute of Mathematical Sciences. In 1972, he received his PhD from the New York University for his thesis Chapman-Eskog-Hilbert Expansion for Models of the Boltzmann Equation under the supervision of Henry McKean. He began teaching at Northwestern University and left for the University of Massachusetts Amherst in 1975. In 1984, he improved a key result in large deviations theory originally due to Jürgen Gärtner, which is now known as Gärtner-Ellis Theorem. He was named fellow of the Institute of Mathematical Statistics in 1999. Ellis died of bile duct cancer in New York City on July 2, 2018, aged 71.
