= Tilted large deviation principle =

Mathematical formula

In mathematics — specifically, in large deviations theory — the tilted large deviation principle is a result that allows one to generate a new large deviation principle from an old one by exponential tilting, i.e. integration against an exponential functional. It can be seen as an alternative formulation of Varadhan's lemma.

== Statement of the theorem ==
Let X be a Polish space (i.e., a separable, completely metrizable topological space), and let (μ_{ε})_{ε>0} be a family of probability measures on X that satisfies the large deviation principle with rate function I : X → [0, +∞]. Let F : X → R be a continuous function that is bounded from above. For each Borel set S ⊆ X, let

$$J_{\varepsilon} (S) = \int_{S} e^{ F(x) / \varepsilon} \, \mathrm{d} \mu_{\varepsilon} (x)$$

and define a new family of probability measures (ν_{ε})_{ε>0} on X by

$$\nu_{\varepsilon} (S) = \frac{J_{\varepsilon} (S)}{J_{\varepsilon} (X)}.$$

Then (ν_{ε})_{ε>0} satisfies the large deviation principle on X with rate function I^{F} : X → [0, +∞] given by

$$I^{F} (x) = \sup_{y \in X} \big[ F(y) - I(y) \big] - \big[ F(x) - I(x) \big].$$
