= Markovo =

Markovo may refer to:

- Markovo, Russia, name of several inhabited localities in Russia
- Markovo, Slovenia, a settlement in the Kamnik Municipality, Slovenia
- Markovo, Croatia, a village near Slatina, Croatia
- Markovo Republic, a self-proclaimed peasant state in Russia from 1905 to 1906
- Markovo tepe, a former hill in Plovdiv, Bulgaria
- Markava, several inhabited localities in Belarus called 'Markovo' in Russian

== See also ==
- Markov
