= Quap =

Quap may refer to:

- Quap, a fictional radioactive compound in the H. G. Wells novel Tono-Bungay
- Laplace's approximation, or the quadratic approximation (QUAP)
