= Freidlin–Wentzell theorem =

Theorem in the large deviations theory of stochastic processes

In mathematics, the Freidlin–Wentzell theorem (due to Mark Freidlin and Alexander D. Wentzell) is a result in the large deviations theory of stochastic processes. Roughly speaking, the Freidlin–Wentzell theorem gives an estimate for the probability that a (scaled-down) sample path of an Itō diffusion will stray far from the mean path. This statement is made precise using rate functions. The Freidlin–Wentzell theorem generalizes Schilder's theorem for standard Brownian motion.

== Statement ==
Let B be a standard Brownian motion on R^{d} starting at the origin, 0 ∈ R^{d}, and let X^{ε} be an R^{d}-valued Itō diffusion solving an Itō stochastic differential equation of the form

$$\begin{cases} dX_t^\varepsilon = b(X_t^\varepsilon) \, dt + \sqrt{\varepsilon} \, dB_t, \\ X_0^\varepsilon = 0, \end{cases}$$

where the drift vector field b : R^{d} → R^{d} is uniformly Lipschitz continuous. Then, on the Banach space C_{0} = C_{0}([0, T]; R^{d}) equipped with the supremum norm ||⋅||_{∞}, the family of processes (X^{ε})_{ε>0} satisfies the large deviations principle with good rate function I : C_{0} → R ∪ {+∞} given by

$$I(\omega) = \frac{1}{2} \int_0^T | \dot{\omega}_t - b(\omega_t) |^2 \, dt$$

if ω lies in the Sobolev space H^{1}([0, T]; R^{d}), and I(ω) = +∞ otherwise. In other words, for every open set G ⊆ C_{0} and every closed set F ⊆ C_{0},

$$\limsup_{\varepsilon \downarrow 0} \big( \varepsilon \log \mathbf{P} \big[ X^\varepsilon \in F \big]\big) \leq -\inf_{\omega \in F} I(\omega)$$

and

$$\liminf_{\varepsilon \downarrow 0} \big( \varepsilon \log \mathbf{P} \big[ X^{\varepsilon} \in G \big]\big) \geq - \inf_{\omega \in G} I(\omega).$$
