= Mark Freidlin =

Russian-American probability theorist

Mark Iosifovich Freidlin (Russian: Марк Иосифович Фрейдлин, born 1938) is a Russian-American probability theorist who works as a Distinguished University Professor of Mathematics at the University of Maryland, College Park. He is one of the namesakes of the Freidlin–Wentzell theory, which is an important part of the large deviations theory. Freidlin and Wentzell are the authors of the first monograph on the large deviations theory for stochastic processes (1979). The Freidlin-Wentzell theory describes, in particular, the long-time effects caused by random perturbations. The latest edition of the book was published by Springer in 2012. It contains not just the results on large deviations but also new results on other asymptotic problems, in particular, on the averaging principle for stochastic perturbations. Other works of Mark Freidlin concern perturbations of Hamiltonian systems, wave front propagation in reaction-diffusion equations, non-linear perturbations of partial differential equations. stochasticity in deterministic dynamical systems.

Freidlin was born in 1938 in Moscow. He began studying mathematics at Moscow State University at the age of 16, and earned a candidate's degree there in 1962, under the supervision of Eugene Dynkin. In 1970 he completed a doctorate. However, growing anti-semitism in the Soviet Union prevented Friedlin from traveling and forced him to transfer from the Mechanics and Mathematics Department at Moscow State to the Bio-Physics Department (with the assistance of Andrey Kolmogorov in finding him this position). By 1979 he had decided to emigrate to the US, but was denied permission to leave Russia; despite having no permanent employment for the next eight years, he continued to work and publish in mathematics. Finally, in 1987, he was able to move to the University of Maryland.

Freidlin was an invited speaker at the 1998 International Congress of Mathematicians. He became a distinguished professor at Maryland in 2000. In May 2003, a conference on "Asymptotic Problems in Stochastic Processes and PDE's" was held at the University of Maryland in honor of Freidlin's 65th birthday. In 2012, he became one of the inaugural fellows of the American Mathematical Society. His doctoral students include Jürgen Gärtner.

== Selected publications ==
- Functional Integration and Partial Differential Equations. Princeton University Press. 21 August 1985. ISBN 0-691-08362-2.
- Markov Processes and Differential Equations: Asymptotic Problems. Springer Science & Business Media. 28 March 1996. ISBN 978-3-7643-5392-6.
- with Alexander D. Wentzell: Random perturbations and dynamical systems. Grundlehren der mathematischen Wissenschaften. Vol. 260 (2nd ed.). Springer. 1998. ISBN 9780387983622; translated by Joseph Szücs; 1st edition 1984; 3rd edition 2012
- with M. Weber: Random perturbations of nonlinear oscillators, Ann. Probability 26 (1998), no. 3, pp. 925–967.
- with M. Weber: Random perturbations of dynamical systems and diffusion processes with conservation laws, Probability Theory Related Fields 128 (2004), pp. 441–466.
- with A.D. Wentzell: On the Neumann problem for PDEs with a small parameter and corresponding diffusion processes, Probab. Theory Relat. Fields 152 (2012), no. 1-2, pp. 101–140.
- with A.D. Wentzell: Diffusion approximation for noise-induced evolution of first integrals in multi-frequency systems, Journal of Statistical Physics, 182, Article number: 45 (2021).
- with L. Koralov: Nonlinear stochastic perturbations of dynamical systems and quasi-linear parabolic PDE's with a small parameter, Probability Theory and Related Fields 147 (2010), pp. 273–301.
- with W. Hu: On perturbations of generalized Landau-Lifshitz dynamics, Journ. Stat. Phys. 144 (2011), no. 5, pp. 978–1008.
- Reaction-diffusion equations in incompressible fluid: asymptotic problems. Journal of Differential Equations, 179, pp 44–96 (2002).
- Large Deviations at Saint-Flour, Springer (2013).
