= Dawson–Gärtner theorem =

Mathematical result in large deviations theory

In mathematics, the Dawson–Gärtner theorem is a result in large deviations theory. Heuristically speaking, the Dawson–Gärtner theorem allows one to transport a large deviation principle on a “smaller” topological space to a “larger” one.

== Statement of the theorem ==
Let (Y_{j})_{j∈J} be a projective system of Hausdorff topological spaces with maps p_{ij} : Y_{j} → Y_{i}. Let X be the projective limit (also known as the inverse limit) of the system (Y_{j}, p_{ij})_{i,j∈J}, i.e.

$$X = \varprojlim_{j \in J} Y_{j} = \left\{ \left. y = (y_{j})_{j \in J} \in Y = \prod_{j \in J} Y_{j} \quad \right| \quad i < j \implies y_{i} = p_{ij} (y_{j}) \right\}.$$

Let (μ_{ε})_{ε>0} be a family of probability measures on X. Assume that, for each j ∈ J, the push-forward measures (p_{j∗}μ_{ε})_{ε>0} on Y_{j} satisfy the large deviation principle with good rate function I_{j} : Y_{j} → R ∪ {+∞}. Then the family (μ_{ε})_{ε>0} satisfies the large deviation principle on X with good rate function I : X → R ∪ {+∞} given by

$$I(x) = \sup_{j \in J} I_{j}(p_{j}(x)).$$
