= Fréchet distribution =

Continuous probability distribution

Fréchet
- Probability density function

- Cumulative distribution function
- Parameters: $\ \alpha \in (0,\infty)\$ shape. Optionally: $\ s \in (0,\infty)\$ scale (default: $\ s=1\$) $\ m \in (-\infty,\infty)\$ location of minimum (default: $\ m=0\$)
- Support: $\ x > m\$
- PDF: $\ \frac{\ \alpha\ }{s} \left( \frac{\ x - m\ }{s}\right)^{-1-\alpha} ~ e^{-(\frac{x-m}{s})^{-\alpha}}\$
- CDF: $\ e^{-(\frac{x-m}{s})^{-\alpha}}\$
- Quantile: $\ m+s\left[\ -\ln p\ \right]^{-\tfrac{1}{\alpha}}\$
- Mean: $$\begin{cases} \ m\ +\ s\ \Gamma\left( 1 - \tfrac{1}{\alpha} \right) ~~ & \text{for }~ \alpha > 1  \\ \ \infty              & \text{otherwise} \end{cases}$$
- Median: $\ m\ +\ \frac{s}{\ {\ln(2)}^{\tfrac{1}{\alpha}}\ }$
- Mode: $\ m\ +\ s \left(\frac{ \alpha }{\ 1 + \alpha}\right)^{1/\alpha\ }$
- Variance: $$\begin{cases} \ s^2\left[\ \Gamma\left(1 - \tfrac{2}{\alpha}\right)- \left[\Gamma\left(1 - \tfrac{1}{\alpha}\right)\right]^2\ \right] ~~ & \text{for }~ \alpha>2  \\ \ \infty              & \text{otherwise} \end{cases}$$
- Skewness: $$\begin{cases} \ \frac{\ A\ }{\ \sqrt{B^3\ }\ }  ~~ & \text{for }~ \alpha > 3  \\ \ \infty              & \text{otherwise} \end{cases}$$ $$\begin{align}\text{where} ~~ A\ \equiv\ &\Gamma\left( 1 - \tfrac {3}{\alpha} \right) \\ & -\ 3\ \Gamma\left( 1 - \tfrac {2}{\alpha}\right)\ \Gamma\left(1 - \tfrac {1}{\alpha}\right)\\ &\quad +\ 2\Bigl[\ \Gamma\left(1 - \tfrac {1}{\alpha} \right)\ \Bigr]^3 \ \end{align}$$ $~ \quad \text{and} ~~ B\ \equiv\ \Gamma\left( 1 - \tfrac{2}{\alpha} \right)\ -\ \Bigr[\ \Gamma\left( 1 - \tfrac{1}{\alpha} \right)\ \Bigr]^2 ~.$
- Excess kurtosis: $$\begin{cases} \ -6\ +\ \frac{\ C\ }{\; D^2 } ~~ & \text{for } ~ \alpha > 4  \\ \ \infty              & \text{otherwise} \end{cases}$$ $$\begin{align}\text{where} ~~ C\ \equiv\ &\Gamma \left( 1 - \tfrac{4}{\alpha} \right) \\ & -\ 4\ \Gamma\left( 1 - \tfrac{3}{\alpha} \right)\ \Gamma\left( 1 - \tfrac{1}{\alpha} \right) \\ & \qquad +\ 3\ \Bigl[\ \Gamma\left( 1 - \tfrac{2}{\alpha} \right)\ \Bigr]^2\ \end{align}$$ $~ \quad \text{and} ~~ D\ \equiv\ \Gamma \left( 1 - \tfrac{2}{\alpha} \right)\ -\ \Bigl[\ \Gamma\left( 1 - \tfrac{1}{\alpha} \right)\ \Bigr]^2 ~.$
- Entropy: $\ 1 + \frac{\gamma}{\alpha} + \gamma_e +\ln \left( \frac{s}{\alpha} \right)\ ,$ where $\ \gamma_e\$ is the Euler–Mascheroni constant.
- MGF: Note: Moment $\ k\$ exists if $\ \alpha > k\$
- CF

In probability theory, the Fréchet distribution, also known as the Type-2 Gumbel or inverse Weibull distribution, is a special case of the generalized extreme value distribution. It has the cumulative distribution function
$$\ \Pr(\ X \le x\ ) = e^{-x^{-\alpha}} ~ \text{ if } ~ x > 0,$$
where α > 0 (sometimes named β) is a shape parameter. It can be generalised to include a location parameter $m \in \Reals$ (sometimes named t_{0}), representing the minimum, which defaults to 0, and a scale parameter s > 0 (sometimes named α), which defaults to 1, resulting in the cumulative distribution function
$$\Pr(X \le x) = \exp\left[-\left( \tfrac{x - m}{s} \right)^{-\alpha}\right] = \exp\left[-\left( \tfrac{s}{x - m} \right)^{\alpha}\right] ~ \text{ if } ~ x > m,$$
and equivalently, the probability density function
$$f(x) = \frac{\alpha}{s} \left( \frac{x - m}{s}\right)^{-1-\alpha} ~ e^{-\left(\frac{x-m}{s}\right)^{-\alpha}} = \frac{\alpha}{x - m} \left( \frac{s}{x - m}\right)^{\alpha} ~ e^{-\left(\frac{s}{x-m}\right)^{\alpha}}.$$
(Note: in some sources, the value of the random variable is denoted t rather than x.)

Alternative parameterizations include:

Parameters	Mapping from alternative	Mapping to alternative	Notes
$a$ (shape), $b$ (scale)	$\alpha = a, s = \sqrt[a]{b}$	$a = \alpha, b = s^\alpha$	
$\beta > 0$ (shape), $\eta > 0$ (scale, the expected time to failure of $\tfrac{1}{e}$ of the population)	$\alpha = \beta, s = \sqrt[-\beta]{\eta}$	$\beta = \alpha, \eta = s^{-\alpha}$	

The distribution was named for Maurice Fréchet who wrote a related paper in 1927. Further work was done by Fisher and Tippett in 1928 and by Gumbel in 1958, as well as various other statisticians.

== Characteristics ==
The single parameter Fréchet, with parameter$\ \alpha$, has standardized moment

$$\mu_k = \int_0^\infty x^k f(x)\ \operatorname{d} x =\int_0^\infty t^{-\frac{k}{\alpha}}e^{-t} \ \operatorname{d} t\ ,$$

(with $\ t = x^{-\alpha}\$) defined only for $\ k<\alpha\ :$

$$\ \mu_k = \Gamma\left(1-\frac{k}{\alpha}\right)\$$

where $\ \Gamma\left(z\right)\$ is the Gamma function.

In particular:

- For $\alpha>1$ the expectation is $E[X]=\Gamma(1-\tfrac{1}{\alpha})$
- For $\alpha>2$ the variance is $\text{Var}(X)=\Gamma(1-\tfrac{2}{\alpha})-\big(\Gamma(1-\tfrac{1}{\alpha})\big)^2.$

The quantile $q_y$ of order $y$ can be expressed through the inverse of the distribution,

$$q_y=F^{-1}(y)=\left(-\log_e y \right)^{-\frac{1}{\alpha}}$$.

In particular the median is:

$$q_{1/2}=(\log_e 2)^{-\frac{1}{\alpha}}.$$

The mode of the distribution is $\left(\frac{\alpha}{\alpha+1}\right)^\frac{1}{\alpha}.$

Especially for the 3-parameter Fréchet, the first quartile is $q_1= m+\frac{s}{\sqrt[\alpha]{\log(4)}}$ and the third quartile $q_3= m+\frac{s}{\sqrt[\alpha]{\log(\frac{4}{3})}}.$

Also the quantiles for the mean and mode are:

$$F(mean)=\exp  \left( -\Gamma^{-\alpha} \left(1- \frac{1}{\alpha} \right)  \right)$$
$$F(mode)=\exp  \left( -\frac{\alpha+1}{\alpha}  \right).$$

== Properties ==
- The Frechet distribution is a max stable distribution
- The negative of a random variable having a Frechet distribution is a min stable distribution

== Generating random variates ==
Given a random variate $U$ drawn from the uniform distribution in the interval $(0, 1)$, then the variate
$$X = \left(-\frac{\ln U}{s^\alpha}\right)^{ -\frac{1}{\alpha} }$$
has a Fréchet distribution. This is obtained by applying the inverse transform sampling method.

== Related distributions ==
The cumulative distribution function of the Frechet distribution solves the maximum stability postulate equation.

Scaling relations include:

- If $\ X \sim U(\ 0, 1\ )\$ (continuous uniform distribution) then $\ m + s\cdot\Bigl( -\log_e\!(X)\ \Bigr)^\frac{ -1\;}{\alpha} \sim \textsf{Frechet}( \alpha, s, m)\$
- If $\ X \sim \textsf{Frechet}(\ \alpha, s, m=0\ )\$ then its reciprocal is Weibull-distributed: $\ \frac{\ 1\ }{ X } \sim \textsf{Weibull}\!\left(\ k = \alpha, \lambda = \tfrac{ 1 }{ s }\ \right)\$
- If $\ X \sim \textsf{Frechet}( \alpha, s, m )\$ then $\ k\ X + b \sim \textrm{Frechet}(\ \alpha, k s, k\ m + b\ )\$
- If $\ X_i \sim \textsf{Frechet}(\ \alpha, s, m\ )\$ and $\ Y=\max\{\ X_1, \ldots,X_n\ \}\$ then $\ Y \sim \textsf{Frechet}(\ \alpha, n^{\tfrac{1}{\alpha}} s, m\ )\$

Substituting $\alpha = -k$ and $s = \lambda$ yields the Weibull distribution. Note, however, that a positive k (as in the Weibull distribution) would yield a negative α and hence a negative probability density, which is not allowed.

== Applications ==
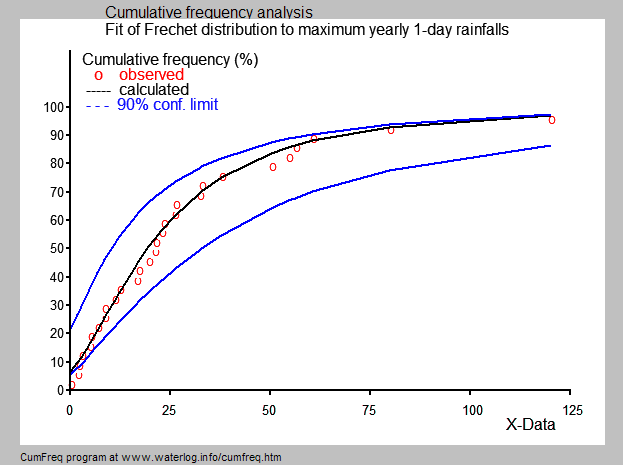
Fitted cumulative Fréchet distribution to extreme one-day rainfalls

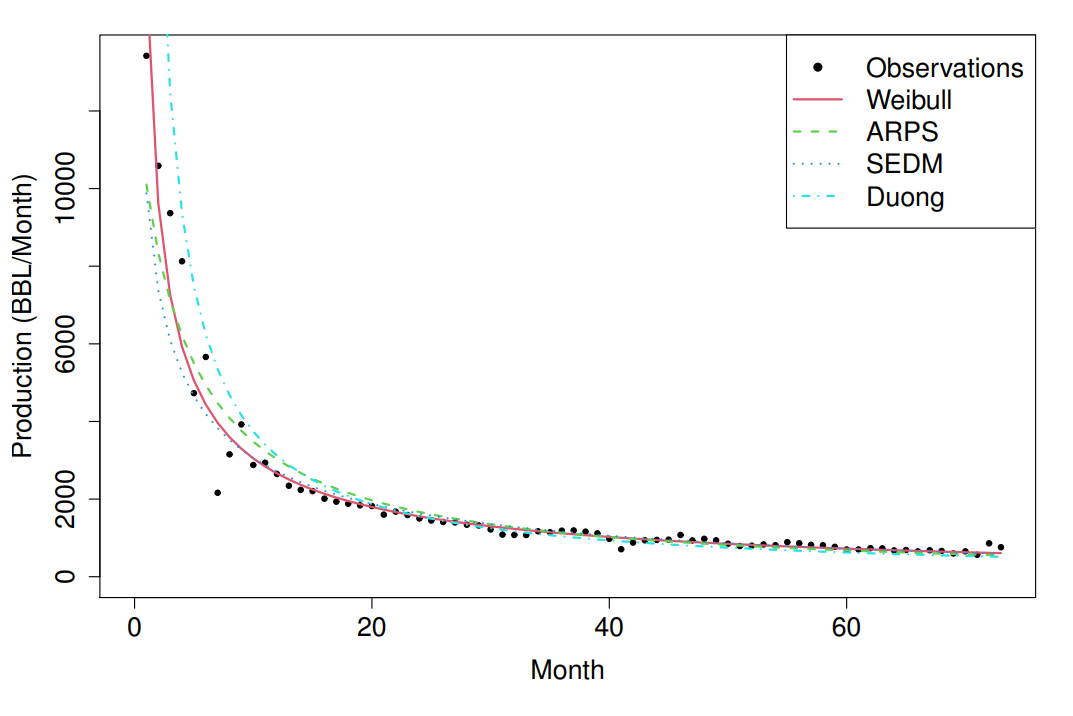
Fitted decline curve analysis. Duong model can be thought of as a generalization of the Frechet distribution.

- In hydrology, the Fréchet distribution is applied to extreme events such as annually maximum one-day rainfalls and river discharges. This picture illustrates an example of fitting the Fréchet distribution to ranked annually maximum one-day rainfalls in Oman showing also the 90% confidence belt based on the binomial distribution. The cumulative frequencies of the rainfall data are represented by plotting positions as part of the cumulative frequency analysis. However, in most hydrological applications, the distribution fitting is via the generalized extreme value distribution as this avoids imposing the assumption that the distribution does not have a lower bound (as required by the Frechet distribution).
- In decline curve analysis, a declining pattern the time series data of oil or gas production rate over time for a well can be described by the Fréchet distribution.
- One test to assess whether a multivariate distribution is asymptotically dependent or independent consists of transforming the data into standard Fréchet margins using the transformation $Z_i = -1/\log F_i(X_i)$ and then mapping from Cartesian to pseudo-polar coordinates $(R, W)= (Z_1 + Z_2, Z_1/(Z_1 + Z_2))$. Values of $R \gg 1$ correspond to the extreme data for which at least one component is large while $W$ approximately 1 or 0 corresponds to only one component being extreme.
- In economics it is used to model the idiosyncratic component of preferences of individuals for different products (Industrial Organization), locations (Urban Economics), or firms (Labor Economics).

== See also ==
- Fisher–Tippett–Gnedenko theorem
- Extreme value theory
- Gumbel distribution
