= Albert Markov =

American musical artist

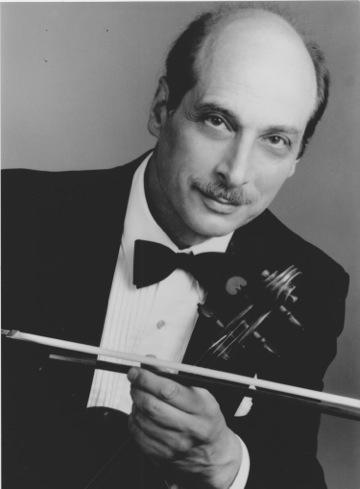

Background information
- Born: Albert Alexandrovich Markov; 8 May 1933 (age 93); Kharkov, Ukraine
- Genre: Classical
- Occupations: violinist, composer, violin pedagogue
- Instrument: Violin
- Years active: 1950s-Present
- Labels: Melodiya; Musical Heritage Society; Sunrise; RMS
- Website: www.albertmarkov.com

Albert Markov (Russian: Альберт Александрович Марков), is a Russian American violinist, composer, conductor, and pedagogue. He is the only concert violinist of the 20th and 21st century who composed major music works which are published, performed and recorded commercially on Sunrise label and published by G. Schirmer. During the time of the Soviet Union he was known as a prominent Soviet classical music artist. Albert Markov began his career as a concert violinist in Russia before immigrating to the United States in 1975.

== Biography ==
Albert Markov was born in 1933 in Kharkiv, Ukraine. He studied violin under Piotr Stolyarsky, Yuri Yankelevich, and Adolf Lechinsky (student of Carl Flesch), and composition under Aram Khachaturian. He was a widely praised Soviet artist.

Markov immigrated to the United States in 1975. His US debut came in 1976 with the Houston Symphony to critical acclaim. The New York Times wrote: “The audience roared approval, coming to its feet for three standing ovations, Mr. Markov wowed them with dazzling pyrotechnics.” Following this, Markov appeared as soloist alongside orchestras and in solo recitals in Carnegie Hall, the Lincoln Center, and the Kennedy Center, and performed in the concert halls of Chicago, Los Angeles, Philadelphia, Houston, Toronto, Montreal and other cities of North and South America, Europe, Asia, and Africa. He has appeared alongside conductors Andrew Davis, James Conlon, Neeme Järvi, David Zinman, Andrew Litton, Lü Shao-chia, Lukas Foss, Sixten Ehrling, Kazuyoshi Akiyama, Sergiu Comissiona, Sir Charles Groves, Natan Rakhlin, Yuri Aranovich, and others. As a soloist, Markov toured internationally together with Aram Khachaturian who conducted his violin concerto.

Albert Markov has recorded the violin concertos of Shostakovich, Szymanowski, Paganini, Mozart, Wieniawski, Ulvi Cemal Erkin, Bidzina Kvernadze, among others, and his own violin concerto. He has collaborated and/or recorded with pianists David Ashkenazi, Bella Davidovich, Oxana Yablonskaya, Andrey Mytnik, Robert Levin, Milton Kaye, and Dmitri Kogan. Markov and his son Alexander Markov regularly perform as a violin duo. Albert Markov's recordings can be found on Melodiya, Musical Heritage Society, Sunrise, and RMS, with works of different periods including his own compositions.

Markov has written many compositions, including his "Chinese" violin concerto and his Formosa suite, which have been recorded with the Russian National Orchestra. He has composed three operas (including Queen Esther), Symphony, 6 Violin Rhapsodies, three Violin Sonatas, and vocal compositions. Additionally, he has published a book, "Performing Analysis of 6 Sonatas and Partitas by J.S.Bach."

During 20 years since 1983 Markov was the music director of the Rondo Chamber Orchestra appearing both as a soloist and conductor. He was a founder of the Rondo Music Society and artistic director of Music Festivals in Nova Scotia, Canada and in Bennington, Vermont, USA from 1995 to 2007. Markov has served on the faculties of the Gnessin Institute in Moscow where he replaced his teacher Y.Yankelevich, the Mannes, New York, and currently, he has served on the faculty of the Manhattan School of Music since 1981. He has published (by G.Schirmer) his own method books, "Violin Technique" and "The Little Violinist," as well as "System of Violin Playing."

Aram Khachaturian wrote: “Albert Markov’s activities have had many facets . . . in all spheres of actions, he shows a remarkable talent. As a violinist, he is one of our best. As a teacher, he has trained excellent violinists. As a composer, he is remarkable in the originality of his compositions. In summary, Albert Markov is an outstanding musician.”

== Personal life ==
His son, Alexander Markov, was a prizewinner at the 1982 Paganini Competition in Genoa, Italy and is also a recipient of the Avery Fisher Career Grant. His wife Marina Markov is also a violinist who has played with the New York City Opera and the Bolshoi orchestra.

== Selected Compositions ==
- System Of Violin Playing
- Violin Concerto, "Chinese"for violin and orchestra
- "Formosa" Suite for violin and orchestra
- "Queen Esther" little opera
- "Carnevale di Venezia" Rhapsody (after N.Paganini) for violin and orchestra
- "Spartacus" Rhapsody (after A.Khachaturian) for violin and orchestra
- "Porgy" Rhapsody (after G.Gershwin) for violin and orchestra
- "Swan Lake" Rhapsody (after P.I.Tchaykovsky) for violin and orchestra
- "Korean "Rhapsody" for violin and orchestra
- "Queen Esther" Rhapsody (after A.Markov's opera) for violin and orchestra
- Symphony "Kinnor David"
