= Alexander D. Wentzell =

Russian-American mathematician

Alexander Dmitrievich Wentzell (Александр Дмитриевич Вентцель, born 16 February 1937, Moscow) is a Russian-American mathematician.

Wentzell graduated from Moscow State University in 1958 and received in 1964 his Russian candidate degree (similar to Ph.D.) from the Steklov Institute in Moscow with advisor Eugene Dynkin. He taught from 1961 as a docent at Moscow State University and from 1966 to 1991 as an assistant professor. In 1984 he received his Russian doctorate (higher doctoral degree) from Moscow State University. For the academic year 1991–1992 he was a visiting professor at the University of Maryland and for the academic year 1992–93 at the University of Minnesota. Since 1993 he has been a professor at Tulane University.

His research deals with stochastic processes, probability theory, functional analysis, and partial differential equations.

In 1963 he received the Prize of the Moscow Mathematical Society. In 1978 he was an Invited Speaker at the International Congress of Mathematicians in Helsinki.

== See also ==
- Freidlin–Wentzell theorem

== Selected publications ==
- with Mark Freidlin: Random perturbations of dynamical systems, Grundlehren der mathematischen Wissenschaften 260, Springer 1984; Frejdlin, Mark Iosifovič; Freĭdlin, Mark Iosifovich; Freidlin, Mark I.; Wentzell, Alexander D.; Ventt︠s︡Elʹ, A. D. (1998). 2nd edition. ISBN 9780387983622.; Freidlin, Mark I.; Wentzell, Alexander D. (2012). 3rd edition. ISBN 978-3-642-25846-6; translated by Joseph Szücs
