= Alexander Markov =

Russian American violinist

- Genres: Classical music, Rock music
- Occupation: Violinist
- Instrument: violin
- Years active: 1980s-present
- Labels: Erato Records, Warner Classics International
- Website: www.alexandermarkov.com

Alexander Markov is a Russian American violinist who has received awards from the Paganini International Violin Competition (gold medal) and the Avery Fisher Career Grant. He is known for his recording of Paganini's 24 Caprices for Solo Violin, particularly for his interpretation of the left-hand pizzicato section of the 24th Caprice. A film of Markov playing the Caprices was directed by Bruno Monsaingeon.

Markov was born in Moscow and studied violin with his father, concert violinist Albert Markov. By the time he was eight years old, he was appearing as a soloist with orchestras and performing double concertos with his father. Markov emigrated to the U.S. with his parents and received his United States citizenship in 1982. He made his New York debut recital at Carnegie Hall and appeared with Christoph Eschenbach conducting the Mostly Mozart Festival Orchestra at Avery Fisher Hall.

Markov has recorded for the Erato label, distributed worldwide by Warner Classics. His releases have included the Tchaikovsky pieces for violin and piano. He has performed with Charles Dutoit, Ivan Fischer, Neeme Järvi, Zdeněk Mácal, Lorin Maazel, and Gerard Schwarz. He has performed with the orchestras such as the Philadelphia Orchestra, Orchestre de Paris, the BBC Symphony, the Montreal Symphony, the Budapest Festival Orchestra, the Detroit Symphony, the New Jersey Symphony, the Seattle Symphony and Houston, Baltimore, Cincinnati and Jerusalem orchestras. He played to great acclaim at the Llandeilo Music festival in west Wales in July 2012.

Yehudi Menuhin has written "He is without doubt one of the most brilliant and musical of violinists… Alexander Markov will certainly leave his mark on the music-lovers of the world and in the annals of the violin virtuosi of our day".
