= Stability postulate =

In probability theory, to obtain a nondegenerate limiting distribution for extremes of samples, it is necessary to "reduce" the actual greatest value by applying a linear transformation with coefficients that depend on the sample size.

If $\ X_1,\ X_2,\ \dots,\ X_n\$ are independent random variables with common probability density function $\ \mathbb{P}\left( X_j = x \right) \equiv F_X(x)\ ,$

then the cumulative distribution function $\ F_{Y_n}\$ for $\ Y_n \equiv \max\{\ X_1,\ \ldots,\ X_n\ \}\$ is given by the simple relation

$$F_{Y_n}(y) = \left[\ F_X(y)\ \right]^n ~.$$

If there is a limiting distribution for the distribution of interest, the stability postulate states that the limiting distribution must be for some sequence of transformed or "reduced" values, such as $\ \left(\ a_n\ Y_n + b_n\ \right)\ ,$ where $\ a_n,\ b_n\$ may depend on n but not on x. This equation was obtained by Maurice René Fréchet and also by Ronald Fisher.

== Only three possible distributions ==
To distinguish the limiting cumulative distribution function from the "reduced" greatest value from $\ F(x)\ ,$ we will denote it by $\ G(y) ~.$ It follows that $\ G(y)\$ must satisfy the functional equation

$$\ \left[\ G\!\left( y \right)\ \right]^n = G\!\left(\ a_n\ y + b_n\ \right) ~.$$

Boris Vladimirovich Gnedenko has shown there are no other distributions satisfying the stability postulate other than the following three:

- Gumbel distribution for the minimum stability postulate
  - If $\ X_i = \textrm{Gumbel}\left(\ \mu,\ \beta \right)\$ and $\ Y \equiv \min\{\ X_1,\ \ldots,\ X_n\ \}\$ then $\ Y \sim a_n\ X + b_n\ ,$
    where $\ a_n = 1\$ and $\ b_n = \beta\ \log n\ ;$
  - In other words, $\ Y \sim \textsf{Gumbel}\left(\ \mu - \beta\ \log n\ ,\ \beta\ \right) ~.$

- Weibull distribution (extreme value) for the maximum stability postulate
  - If $\ X_i = \textsf{Weibull}\left(\ \mu,\ \sigma\ \right)\$ and $\ Y \equiv \max\{\,X_1,\ldots,X_n\,\}\$ then $\ Y \sim a_n\ X + b_n\ ,$
    where $\ a_n = 1\$ and $\ b_n = \sigma\ \log\!\left( \tfrac{1}{n} \right)\ ;$
  - In other words, $\ Y \sim \textsf{Weibull}\left(\ \mu - \sigma \log\!\left(\tfrac{1}{n}\ \right)\ ,\ \sigma\ \right) ~.$

- Fréchet distribution for the maximum stability postulate
  - If $\ X_i=\textsf{Frechet}\left(\ \alpha,\ s,\ m\ \right)\$ and $\ Y \equiv \max\{\ X_1,\ \ldots,\ X_n\ \}\$ then $\ Y \sim a_n\ X + b_n\ ,$
    where $\ a_n = n^{-\tfrac{1}{\alpha}}\$ and $\ b_n = m \left( 1 - n^{-\tfrac{1}{\alpha}} \right)\ ;$
  - In other words, $\ Y \sim \textsf{Frechet}\left(\ \alpha,n^{\tfrac{1}{\alpha}} s\ ,\ m\ \right) ~.$
