= Markava =

Markava (Belarusian: Маркава; Russian: Марково, romanized: Markovo) may refer to the following places in Belarus:

- Markava, Hlybokaye District, a village in Hlybokaye District, Vitebsk Region
- Markava, Maladzyechna District, an agrotown in Maladzyechna District, Minsk Region
- Markava, Shumilina District, a village in Shumilina District, Vitebsk Region
