= Markovian =

Markovian is an adjective that may describe:

- In probability theory and statistics, subjects named for Andrey Markov:
  - A Markov chain or Markov process, a stochastic model describing a sequence of possible events
  - The Markov property, the memoryless property of a stochastic process
- The Markovians, an extinct god-like species in Jack L. Chalker's Well World series of novels
- Markovian Parallax Denigrate, references a mysterious series of Usenet messages

== See also ==
- Markov (surname)
