= Varadhan's lemma =

In mathematics, Varadhan's lemma is a result from the large deviations theory named after S. R. Srinivasa Varadhan. The result gives information on the asymptotic distribution of a statistic φ(Z_{ε}) of a family of random variables Z_{ε} as ε becomes small in terms of a rate function for the variables.

== Statement of the lemma ==
Let X be a regular topological space; let (Z_{ε})_{ε>0} be a family of random variables taking values in X; let μ_{ε} be the law (probability measure) of Z_{ε}. Suppose that (μ_{ε})_{ε>0} satisfies the large deviation principle with good rate function I : X → [0, +∞]. Let ϕ : X → R be any continuous function. Suppose that at least one of the following two conditions holds true: either the tail condition

$$\lim_{M \to \infty} \limsup_{\varepsilon \to 0} \big(\varepsilon \log \mathbf{E} \big[ \exp\big(\phi(Z_{\varepsilon}) / \varepsilon\big)\,\mathbf{1}\big(\phi(Z_{\varepsilon}) \geq M\big) \big]\big) =  -\infty,$$

where 1(E) denotes the indicator function of the event E; or, for some γ > 1, the moment condition

$$\limsup_{\varepsilon \to 0} \big(\varepsilon \log \mathbf{E} \big[ \exp\big(\gamma \phi(Z_{\varepsilon}) / \varepsilon\big) \big]\big) < \infty.$$

Then

$$\lim_{\varepsilon \to 0} \varepsilon \log \mathbf{E} \big[ \exp\big(\phi(Z_{\varepsilon}) / \varepsilon\big) \big] = \sup_{x \in X} \big( \phi(x) - I(x) \big).$$

== See also ==
- Laplace principle (large deviations theory)
