= Laplace principle (large deviations theory) =

Theorem in mathematics

In mathematics, Laplace's principle is a basic theorem in large deviations theory which is similar to Varadhan's lemma. It gives an asymptotic expression for the Lebesgue integral of exp(−θφ(x)) over a fixed set A as θ becomes large. Such expressions can be used, for example, in statistical mechanics to determining the limiting behaviour of a system as the temperature tends to absolute zero.

== Statement of the result ==
Let A be a Lebesgue-measurable subset of d-dimensional Euclidean space R^{d} and let φ : R^{d} → R be a measurable function with

$$\int_A e^{-\varphi(x)} \,dx < \infty.$$

Then

$$\lim_{\theta \to \infty} \frac1{\theta} \log \int_A e^{-\theta \varphi(x)} \, dx = - \mathop{\mathrm{ess \, inf}}_{x \in A} \varphi(x),$$

where ess inf denotes the essential infimum. Heuristically, this may be read as saying that for large θ,

$$\int_A e^{-\theta \varphi(x)} \, dx \approx \exp \left(-\theta \mathop{\mathrm{ess \, inf}}_{x \in A} \varphi(x) \right).$$

== Application ==
The Laplace principle can be applied to the family of probability measures P_{θ} given by

$$\mathbf{P}_\theta (A) = \left( \int_A e^{-\theta \varphi(x)} \, dx \right) \bigg/ \left( \int_{\mathbf{R}^{d}} e^{-\theta \varphi(y)} \, dy \right)$$

to give an asymptotic expression for the probability of some event A as θ becomes large. For example, if X is a standard normally distributed random variable on R, then

$$\lim_{\varepsilon \downarrow 0} \varepsilon \log \mathbf{P} \big[ \sqrt{\varepsilon} X \in A \big] = - \mathop{\mathrm{ess \, inf}}_{x \in A} \frac{x^2}{2}$$

for every measurable set A.

== See also ==
- Laplace's method
