= Cramér's theorem (large deviations) =

Fundamental result in the theory of large deviations

Cramér's theorem is a fundamental result in the theory of large deviations, a subdiscipline of probability theory. It determines the rate function of a series of iid random variables. A weak version of this result was first shown by Harald Cramér in 1938.

== Statement ==
The logarithmic moment generating function (which is the cumulant-generating function) of a random variable is defined as:

$$\Lambda(t)=\log \operatorname E [\exp(tX_1)].$$

Let $X_1, X_2, \dots$ be a sequence of iid real random variables with finite logarithmic moment generating function, i.e. $\Lambda(t) < \infty$ for all $t \in \mathbb R$.

Then the Legendre transform of $\Lambda$:

$$\Lambda^*(x):= \sup_{t \in \mathbb R} \left(tx-\Lambda(t) \right)$$

satisfies,

$$\lim_{n \to \infty} \frac 1n \log \left(P\left(\sum_{i=1}^n X_i \geq nx \right)\right) = -\Lambda^*(x)$$

for all $x > \operatorname E[X_1].$

In the terminology of the theory of large deviations the result can be reformulated as follows:

If $X_1, X_2, \dots$ is a series of iid random variables, then the distributions $\left(\mathcal L ( \tfrac 1n \sum_{i=1}^n X_i) \right)_{n \in \N}$ satisfy a large deviation principle with rate function $\Lambda^*$, where $\mathcal{L}(X)$ denotes the distribution of the random variable $X$.
