= Contraction principle (large deviations theory) =

Theorem

In mathematics — specifically, in large deviations theory — the contraction principle is a theorem that states how a large deviation principle on one space "pushes forward" (via the pushforward of a probability measure) to a large deviation principle on another space via a continuous function.

== Statement ==
Let X and Y be Hausdorff topological spaces and let (μ_{ε})_{ε>0} be a family of probability measures on X that satisfies the large deviation principle with rate function I : X → [0, +∞]. Let T : X → Y be a continuous function, and let ν_{ε} = T_{∗}(μ_{ε}) be the push-forward measure of μ_{ε} by T, i.e., for each measurable set/event E ⊆ Y, ν_{ε}(E) = μ_{ε}(T^{−1}(E)). Let

$$J(y) := \inf \{ I(x) \mid x \in X \text{ and } T(x) = y \},$$

with the convention that the infimum of I over the empty set ∅ is +∞. Then:

- J : Y → [0, +∞] is a rate function on Y,
- J is a good rate function on Y if I is a good rate function on X, and
- (ν_{ε})_{ε>0} satisfies the large deviation principle on Y with rate function J.
