= Infinite divisibility =

Concept in philosophy and mathematics

Infinite divisibility arises in different ways in philosophy, physics, economics, order theory (a branch of mathematics), and probability theory (also a branch of mathematics). One may speak of infinite divisibility, or the lack thereof, of matter, space, time, money, or abstract mathematical objects such as the continuum.

== In philosophy ==
The origin of the idea in the Western tradition can be traced to the 5th century BCE starting with the Ancient Greek pre-Socratic philosopher Democritus and his teacher Leucippus, who theorized matter's divisibility beyond what can be perceived by the senses until ultimately ending at an indivisible atom. The Indian philosopher, Maharshi Kanada also proposed an atomistic theory, however there is ambiguity around when this philosopher lived, ranging from sometime between the 6th century to 2nd century BCE. Around 500 BC, he postulated that if we go on dividing matter (padarth), we shall get smaller and smaller particles. Ultimately, a time will come when we shall come across the smallest particles beyond which further division will not be possible. He named these particles Parmanu. Another Indian philosopher, Pakudha Katyayama, elaborated this doctrine and said that these particles normally exist in a combined form which gives us various forms of matter. Atomism is explored in Plato's dialogue Timaeus. Aristotle proves that both length and time are infinitely divisible, refuting atomism. Andrew Pyle gives a lucid account of infinite divisibility in the first few pages of his Atomism and its Critics. There he shows how infinite divisibility involves the idea that there is some extended item, such as an apple, which can be divided infinitely many times, where one never divides down to point, or to atoms of any sort. Many philosophers claim that infinite divisibility involves either a collection of an infinite number of items (since there are infinite divisions, there must be an infinite collection of objects), or (more rarely), point-sized items, or both. Pyle states that the mathematics of infinitely divisible extensions involve neither of these — that there are infinite divisions, but only finite collections of objects and they never are divided down to point extension-less items.

In Zeno's arrow paradox, Zeno questioned how an arrow can move if at one moment it is here and motionless and at a later moment be somewhere else and motionless.

Zeno's reasoning, however, is fallacious, when he says that if everything when it occupies an equal space is at rest, and if that which is in locomotion is always occupying such a space at any moment, the flying arrow is therefore motionless. This is false, for time is not composed of indivisible moments any more than any other magnitude is composed of indivisibles.

— Aristotle, Physics VI:9, 239b5

In reference to Zeno's paradox of the arrow in flight, Alfred North Whitehead writes that "an infinite number of acts of becoming may take place in a finite time if each subsequent act is smaller in a convergent series":

The argument, so far as it is valid, elicits a contradiction from the two premises: (i) that in a becoming something (res vera) becomes, and (ii) that every act of becoming is divisible into earlier and later sections which are themselves acts of becoming. Consider, for example, an act of becoming during one second. The act is divisible into two acts, one during the earlier half of the second, the other during the later half of the second. Thus that which becomes during the whole second presupposes that which becomes during the first half-second. Analogously, that which becomes during the first half-second presupposes that which becomes during the first quarter-second, and so on indefinitely. Thus if we consider the process of becoming up to the beginning of the second in question, and ask what then becomes, no answer can be given. For, whatever creature we indicate presupposes an earlier creature which became after the beginning of the second and antecedently to the indicated creature. Therefore there is nothing which becomes, so as to effect a transition into the second in question.

— A.N. Whitehead, Process and Reality

== In quantum physics ==
Until the discovery of quantum mechanics, no distinction was made between the question of whether matter is infinitely divisible and the question of whether matter can be cut into smaller parts ad infinitum.

As a result, the Greek word átomos (ἄτομος), which literally means "uncuttable", is usually translated as "indivisible". Whereas the modern atom is indeed divisible, it actually is uncuttable: there is no partition of space such that its parts correspond to material parts of the atom. In other words, the quantum-mechanical description of matter no longer conforms to the cookie cutter paradigm. This casts fresh light on the ancient conundrum of the divisibility of matter. The multiplicity of a material object—the number of its parts—depends on the existence, not of delimiting surfaces, but of internal spatial relations (relative positions between parts), and these lack determinate values. According to the Standard Model of particle physics, the particles that make up an atom—quarks and electrons—are point particles: they do not take up space. What makes an atom nevertheless take up space is not any spatially extended "stuff" that "occupies space", and that might be cut into smaller and smaller pieces, but the indeterminacy of its internal spatial relations.

Physical space is often regarded as infinitely divisible: it is thought that any region in space, no matter how small, could be further split. Time is similarly considered as infinitely divisible.

However, according to the best currently accepted theory in physics, the Standard Model, there is a distance (called the Planck length, 1.616229(38)×10^{−35} metres, named after one of the fathers of Quantum Theory, Max Planck) and therefore a time interval (the amount of time which light takes to traverse that distance in a vacuum, 5.39116(13) × 10^{−44} seconds, known as the Planck time) at which the Standard Model is expected to break down – effectively making this the smallest physical scale about which meaningful statements can be currently made. To predict the physical behaviour of space-time and fundamental particles at smaller distances requires a new theory of Quantum Gravity, which unifies the hitherto incompatible theories of Quantum Mechanics and General Relativity.

== In economics ==
One dollar, or one euro, is divided into 100 cents; one can only pay in increments of a cent. It is quite commonplace for prices of some commodities such as gasoline to be in increments of a tenth of a cent per gallon or per litre. If gasoline costs $3.979 per gallon and one buys 10 gallons, then the "extra" 9/10 of a cent comes to ten times that: an "extra" 9 cents, so the cent in that case gets paid. Money is infinitely divisible in the sense that it is based upon the real number system. However, modern day coins are not divisible (in the past some coins were weighed with each transaction, and were considered divisible with no particular limit in mind). There is a point of precision in each transaction that is useless because such small amounts of money are insignificant to humans. The more the price is multiplied the more the precision could matter. For example, when buying a million shares of stock, the buyer and seller might be interested in a tenth of a cent price difference, but it's only a choice. Everything else in business measurement and choice is similarly divisible to the degree that the parties are interested. For example, financial reports may be reported annually, quarterly, or monthly. Some business managers run cash-flow reports more than once per day.

Although time may be infinitely divisible, data on securities prices are reported at discrete times. For example, if one looks at records of stock prices in the 1920s, one may find the prices at the end of each day, but perhaps not at three-hundredths of a second after 12:47 PM. A new method, however, theoretically, could report at double the rate, which would not prevent further increases of velocity of reporting. Perhaps paradoxically, technical mathematics applied to financial markets is often simpler if infinitely divisible time is used as an approximation. Even in those cases, a precision is chosen with which to work, and measurements are rounded to that approximation. In terms of human interaction, money and time are divisible, but only to the point where further division is not of value, which point cannot be determined exactly.

== In order theory ==
To say that the field of rational numbers is infinitely divisible (i.e. order theoretically dense) means that between any two rational numbers there is another rational number. By contrast, the ring of integers is not infinitely divisible.

Infinite divisibility does not imply gaplessness: the rationals do not enjoy the least upper bound property. That means that if one were to partition the rationals into two non-empty sets A and B where A contains all rationals less than some irrational number (π, say) and B all rationals greater than it, then A has no largest member and B has no smallest member. The field of real numbers, by contrast, is both infinitely divisible and gapless. Any linearly ordered set that is infinitely divisible and gapless, and has more than one member, is uncountably infinite. For a proof, see Cantor's first uncountability proof. Infinite divisibility alone implies infiniteness but not uncountability, as the rational numbers exemplify.

== In probability distributions ==
To say that a probability distribution F on the real line is infinitely divisible means that if X is any random variable whose distribution is F, then for every positive integer n there exist n independent identically distributed random variables X_{1}, ..., X_{n} whose sum is equal in distribution to X (those n other random variables do not usually have the same probability distribution as X).

The Poisson distribution, the stuttering Poisson distribution, the negative binomial distribution, and the Gamma distribution are examples of infinitely divisible distributions — as are the normal distribution, Cauchy distribution and all other members of the stable distribution family. The skew-normal distribution is an example of a non-infinitely divisible distribution. (See Domínguez-Molina and Rocha-Arteaga (2007).)

Every infinitely divisible probability distribution corresponds in a natural way to a Lévy process, i.e., a stochastic process { X_{t} : t ≥ 0 } with stationary independent increments (stationary means that for s < t, the probability distribution of X_{t} − X_{s} depends only on t − s; independent increments means that that difference is independent of the corresponding difference on any interval not overlapping with [s, t], and similarly for any finite number of intervals).

This concept of infinite divisibility of probability distributions was introduced in 1929 by Bruno de Finetti.

== See also ==
- Divisible group, a mathematical group in which every element is an arbitrary multiple of some other element
- Indecomposable distribution
- Salami slicing
- Zeno's paradoxes
