= Large deviations theory =

Branch of probability theory

In probability theory, the theory of large deviations concerns the asymptotic behaviour of remote tails of sequences of probability distributions. The large deviation theory is simply a generalization of the Einstein fluctuation theory, first proposed by Albert Einstein in 1907. While some basic ideas of the mathematics can be traced to Laplace, the mathematical formalization of Einstein's theory was initiated by Cramér and Lundberg. A unified formalization of large deviation theory was developed in 1966, in a paper by S. R. Srinivasa Varadhan. Large deviations theory formalizes the heuristic ideas of concentration of measures and widely generalizes the notion of convergence of probability measures.

Roughly speaking, large deviations theory concerns itself with the exponential decline of the probability measures of certain kinds of extreme or tail events.

== Introductory examples ==
Any large deviation is done in the least unlikely of all the unlikely ways!

— Frank den Hollander, Large Deviations, p. 10

=== An elementary example ===
Consider a sequence of independent tosses of a fair coin. The possible outcomes could be heads or tails. Let us denote the possible outcome of the i-th trial by $X_i$, where we encode head as 1 and tail as 0. Now let $M_N$ denote the mean value after $N$ trials, namely

$M_N = \frac{1}{N}\sum_{i=1}^{N} X_i$.

Then $M_N$ lies between 0 and 1. From the law of large numbers it follows that as N grows, the distribution of $M_N$ converges to $0.5 = \operatorname{E}[X]$ (the expected value of a single coin toss).

Moreover, by the central limit theorem, it follows that $M_N$ is approximately normally distributed for large $N$. The central limit theorem can provide more detailed information about the behavior of $M_N$ than the law of large numbers. For example, we can approximately find a tail probability of $M_N$ – the probability that $M_N$ is greater than some value $x$ – for a fixed value of $N$. However, the approximation by the central limit theorem may not be accurate if $x$ is far from $\operatorname{E}[X_i]$ and $N$ is not sufficiently large. Also, it does not provide information about the convergence of the tail probabilities as $N \to \infty$. However, the large deviation theory can provide answers for such problems.

Let us make this statement more precise. For a given value $0.5<x<1$, let us compute the tail probability $P(M_N > x)$. Define

$I(x) = x\ln{x} + (1-x) \ln(1-x) + \ln{2}$.

Note that the function $I(x)$ is a convex, nonnegative function that is zero at $x = \tfrac{1}{2}$ and increases as $x$ approaches $1$. It is the negative of the Bernoulli entropy with $p = \tfrac{1}{2}$; that it's appropriate for coin tosses follows from the asymptotic equipartition property applied to a Bernoulli trial. Then by Chernoff's inequality, it can be shown that $P(M_N > x) < \exp(-NI(x))$. This bound is rather sharp, in the sense that $I(x)$ cannot be replaced with a larger number which would yield a strict inequality for all positive $N$. (However, the exponential bound can still be reduced by a subexponential factor on the order of $1/\sqrt N$; this follows from the Stirling approximation applied to the binomial coefficient appearing in the Bernoulli distribution.) Hence, we obtain the following result:

$P(M_N > x) \approx \exp(-NI(x))$.

The probability $P(M_N > x)$ decays exponentially as $N \to \infty$ at a rate depending on x. This formula approximates any tail probability of the sample mean of i.i.d. variables and gives its convergence as the number of samples increases.

=== Large deviations for sums of independent random variables ===
In the above example of coin-tossing we explicitly assumed that each toss is an independent trial, and the probability of getting head or tail is always the same.

Let $X,X_1,X_2, \ldots$ be independent and identically distributed (i.i.d.) random variables whose common distribution satisfies a certain growth condition. Then the following limit exists:

$\lim_{N\to \infty} \frac{1}{N} \ln P(M_N > x) = - I(x)$.

Here

$M_N = \frac{1}{N}\sum_{i=1}^{N} X_i$,

as before.

Function $I(\cdot)$ is called the "rate function" or "Cramér function" or sometimes the "entropy function".

The above-mentioned limit means that for large $N$,

$P(M_N >x) \approx \exp[-NI(x) ]$,

which is the basic result of large deviations theory.

If we know the probability distribution of $X$, an explicit expression for the rate function can be obtained. This is given by a Legendre–Fenchel transformation,

$I(x) = \sup_{\theta > 0} [\theta x - \lambda(\theta)]$,

where

$$\lambda(\theta) = \ln \operatorname{E}[\exp(\theta X)]$$

is called the cumulant generating function (CGF) and $\operatorname{E}$ denotes the mathematical expectation.

If $X$ follows a normal distribution, the rate function becomes a parabola with its apex at the mean of the normal distribution.

If $\{X_i\}$ is an irreducible and aperiodic Markov chain, the variant of the basic large deviations result stated above may hold.

=== Moderate deviations for sums of independent random variables ===
The previous example controlled the probability of the event $[M_N>x]$, that is, the concentration of the law of $M_N$ on the compact set $[-x,x]$. It is also possible to control the probability of the event $[M_N>x a_N]$ for some sequence $a_N\to 0$. The following is an example of a moderate deviations principle:

Theorem—Let $X_1,X_2,\dots$ be a sequence of centered i.i.d variables with finite variance $\sigma^2$ such that $\forall \lambda \in \mathbb{R}, \ \ln\mathbb{E}[e^{\lambda X_1}]<\infty$. Define $M_N:=\frac{1}{N}\sum\limits_{n\leq N} X_N$. Then for any sequence $1\ll a_N \ll \sqrt{N}$:

$\lim\limits_{N\to +\infty} \frac{a_N^2}{N} \ln \mathbb{P}[a_N M_N\geq x] = -\frac{x^2}{2\sigma^2}$

In particular, the limit case $a_N=\sqrt{N}$ is the central limit theorem.

== Formal definition ==
Given a Polish space $\mathcal{X}$ let $\{\mathbb{P}_N\}$ be a sequence of Borel probability measures on $\mathcal{X}$, let $\{a_N\}$ be a sequence of positive real numbers such that $\lim_N a_N=\infty$, and finally let $I:\mathcal{X}\to [0, \infty]$ be a lower semicontinuous functional on $\mathcal{X}.$ The sequence $\{\mathbb{P}_N\}$ is said to satisfy a large deviation principle with speed $\{a_n\}$ and rate $I$ if, and only if, for each Borel measurable set $E \subset \mathcal{X}$,

$-\inf_{x \in E^\circ} I(x) \le \varliminf_N a_N^{-1} \log(\mathbb{P}_N(E)) \le \varlimsup_N a_N^{-1} \log(\mathbb{P}_N(E)) \le -\inf_{x \in \overline{E}} I(x)$,

where $\overline{E}$ and $E^\circ$ denote respectively the closure and interior of $E$.

== Brief history ==
The first rigorous results concerning large deviations are due to the Swedish mathematician Harald Cramér, who applied them to model the insurance business. From the point of view of an insurance company, the earning is at a constant rate per month (the monthly premium) but the claims come randomly. For the company to be successful over a certain period of time (preferably many months), the total earning should exceed the total claim. Thus to estimate the premium you have to ask the following question: "What should we choose as the premium $q$ such that over $N$ months the total claim $C = \Sigma X_i$ should be less than $Nq$?" This is clearly the same question asked by the large deviations theory. Cramér gave a solution to this question for i.i.d. random variables, where the rate function is expressed as a power series.

A very incomplete list of mathematicians who have made important advances would include Petrov, Sanov, S.R.S. Varadhan (who has won the Abel prize for his contribution to the theory), D. Ruelle, O.E. Lanford, Mark Freidlin, Alexander D. Wentzell, Amir Dembo, and Ofer Zeitouni.

== Applications ==
Principles of large deviations may be effectively applied to gather information out of a probabilistic model. Thus, theory of large deviations finds its applications in information theory and risk management. In physics, the best known application of large deviations theory arise in thermodynamics and statistical mechanics (in connection with relating entropy with rate function).

=== Large deviations and entropy ===
The rate function is related to the entropy in statistical mechanics. This can be heuristically seen in the following way. In statistical mechanics the entropy of a particular macro-state is related to the number of micro-states which corresponds to this macro-state. In our coin tossing example the mean value $M_N$ could designate a particular macro-state. And the particular sequence of heads and tails which gives rise to a particular value of $M_N$ constitutes a particular micro-state. Loosely speaking a macro-state having a higher number of micro-states giving rise to it, has higher entropy. And a state with higher entropy has a higher chance of being realised in actual experiments. The macro-state with mean value of 1/2 (as many heads as tails) has the highest number of micro-states giving rise to it and it is indeed the state with the highest entropy. And in most practical situations we shall indeed obtain this macro-state for large numbers of trials. The "rate function" on the other hand measures the probability of appearance of a particular macro-state. The smaller the rate function the higher is the chance of a macro-state appearing. In our coin-tossing the value of the "rate function" for mean value equal to 1/2 is zero. In this way one can see the "rate function" as the negative of the "entropy".

There is a relation between the "rate function" in large deviations theory and the Kullback–Leibler divergence, the connection is established by Sanov's theorem (see Sanov and Novak, ch. 14.5).

In a special case, large deviations are closely related to the concept of Gromov–Hausdorff limits.

== See also ==
- Large deviation principle
- Cramér's large deviation theorem
- Chernoff's inequality
- Sanov's theorem
- Contraction principle (large deviations theory), a result on how large deviations principles "push forward"
- Freidlin–Wentzell theorem, a large deviations principle for Itō diffusions
- Legendre transformation, Ensemble equivalence is based on this transformation.
- Laplace principle, a large deviations principle in R^{d}
- Laplace's method
- Schilder's theorem, a large deviations principle for Brownian motion
- Varadhan's lemma
- Extreme value theory
- Large deviations of Gaussian random functions

== Bibliography ==
- Special invited paper: Large deviations by S. R. S. Varadhan The Annals of Probability 2008, Vol. 36, No. 2, 397–419 doi:10.1214/07-AOP348
- A basic introduction to large deviations: Theory, applications, simulations, Hugo Touchette, arXiv:1106.4146.
- Entropy, Large Deviations and Statistical Mechanics by R.S. Ellis, Springer Publication. ISBN 3-540-29059-1
- Large Deviations for Performance Analysis by Alan Weiss and Adam Shwartz. Chapman and Hall ISBN 0-412-06311-5
- Large Deviations Techniques and Applications by Amir Dembo and Ofer Zeitouni. Springer ISBN 0-387-98406-2
- A course on large deviations with an introduction to Gibbs measures by Firas Rassoul-Agha and Timo Seppäläinen. Grad. Stud. Math., 162. American Mathematical Society ISBN 978-0-8218-7578-0
- Random Perturbations of Dynamical Systems by M.I. Freidlin and A.D. Wentzell. Springer ISBN 0-387-98362-7
- "Large Deviations for Two Dimensional Navier-Stokes Equation with Multiplicative Noise", S. S. Sritharan and P. Sundar, Stochastic Processes and Their Applications, Vol. 116 (2006) 1636–1659.
- "Large Deviations for the Stochastic Shell Model of Turbulence", U. Manna, S. S. Sritharan and P. Sundar, NoDEA Nonlinear Differential Equations Appl. 16 (2009), no. 4, 493–521.
