= Frequency analysis (disambiguation) =

Frequency analysis may refer to:

- Frequency analysis (cryptanalysis)
- Lexical frequency analysis (word lists)
- Frequency estimation, a method to find the frequency spectrum of a function
- Frequency distributions estimates
- Cumulative frequency analysis
