= Environmental impact of reservoirs =

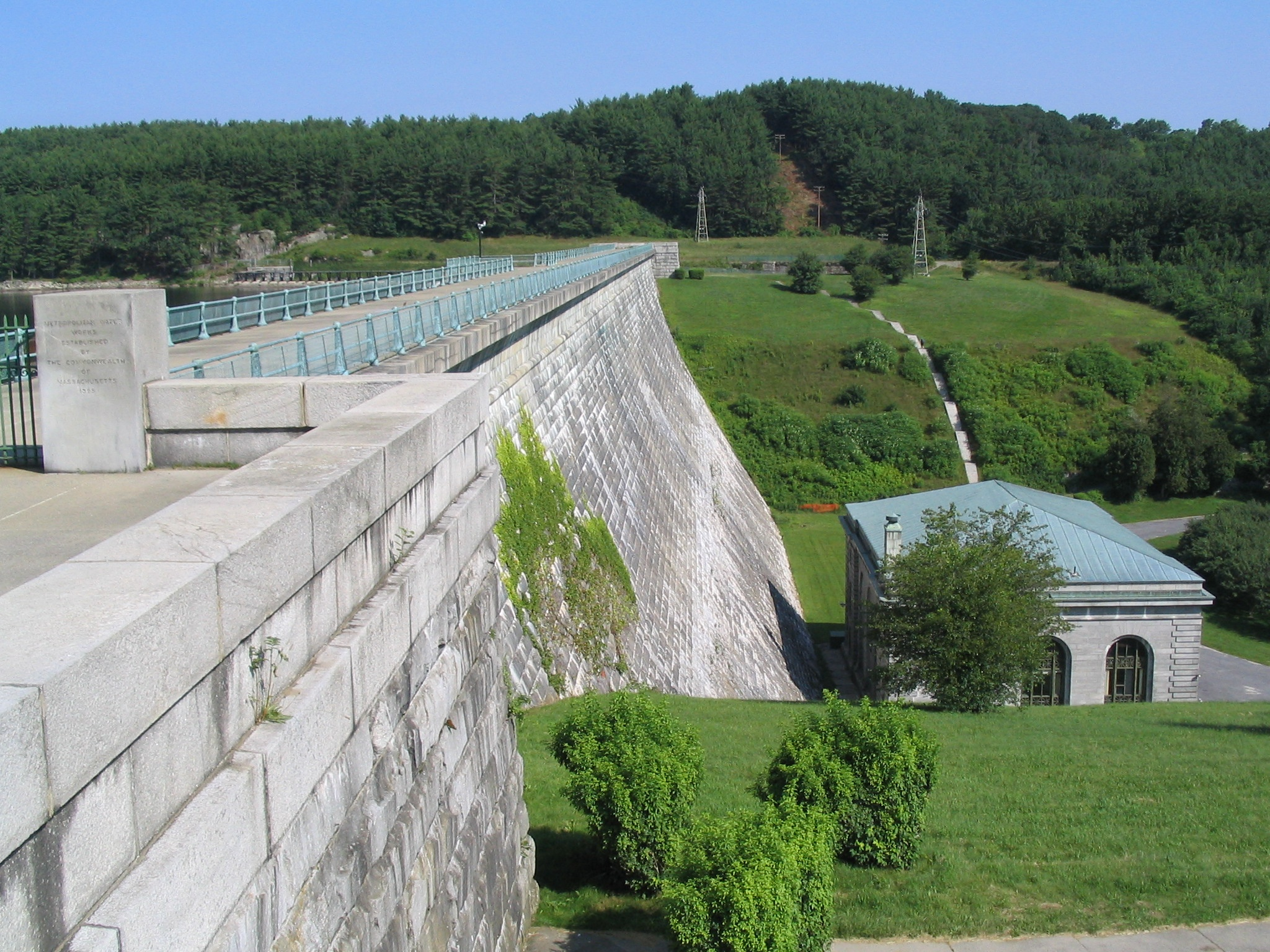
The Wachusett Dam in Clinton, Massachusetts

The environmental impact of reservoirs comes under ever-increasing scrutiny as the global demand for water and energy increases and the number and size of reservoirs increases.

Dams and reservoirs can be used to supply drinking water, generate hydroelectric power, increase the water supply for irrigation, provide recreational opportunities, and flood control. In 1960 the construction of Llyn Celyn and the flooding of Capel Celyn provoked political uproar which continues to this day. More recently, the construction of Three Gorges Dam and other similar projects throughout Asia, Africa and Latin America have generated considerable environmental and political debate. Currently, 48 percent of rivers and their hydro-ecological systems are affected by reservoirs and dams.

== Upstream impacts ==
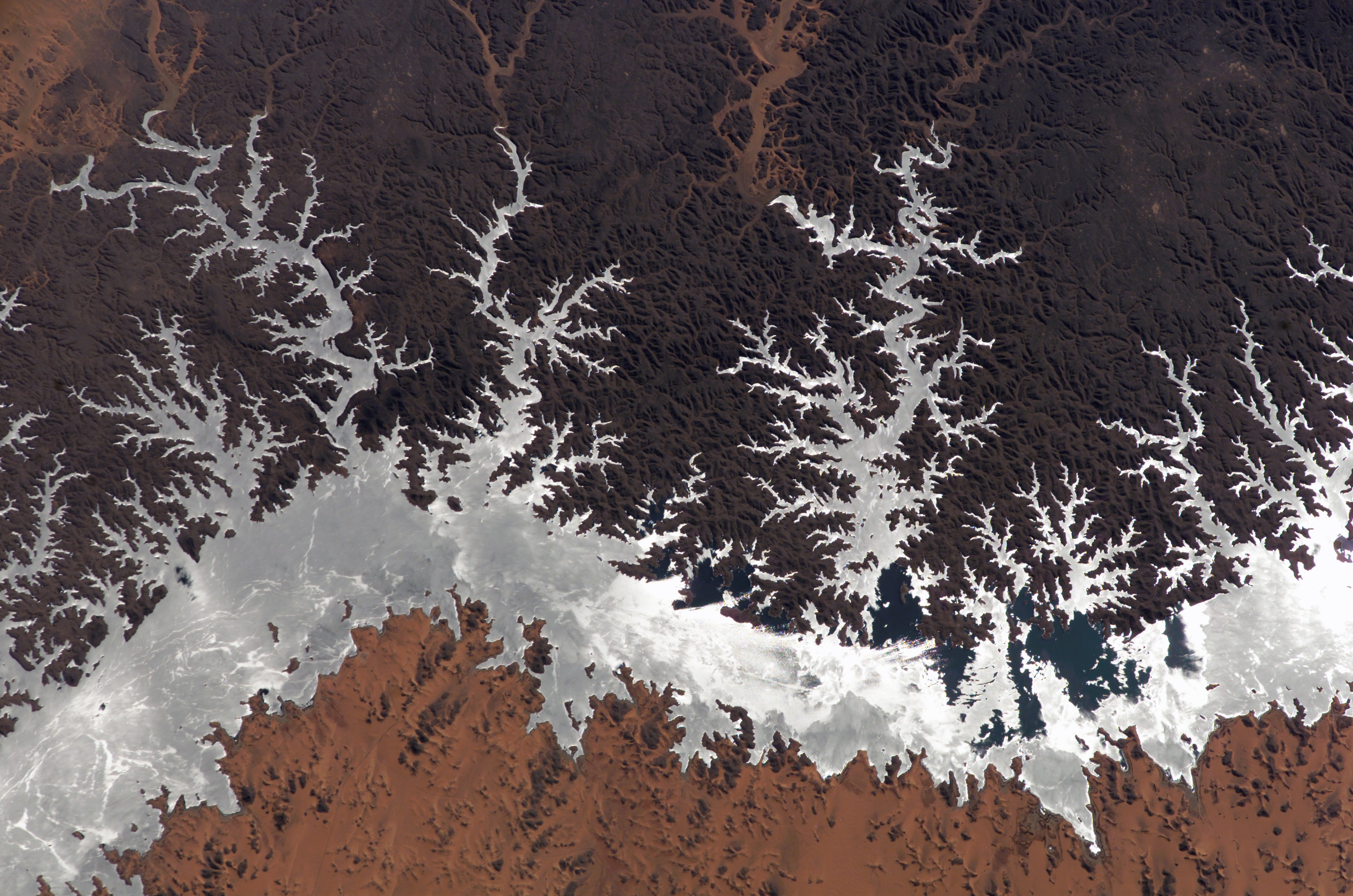
Lake Nasser behind the Aswan Dam, Egypt, 5250 km^{2}, displaced 60,000 people.

=== Fragmentation of river ecosystems ===
A dam acts as a barrier between the upstream and downstream movement of migratory river animals, such as salmon and trout.

Some communities have also begun the practice of transporting migratory fish upstream to spawn via a barge. The fish ladder is another method to transport migratory fish upstream.

=== Reservoir sedimentation ===
Rivers carry sediment down their riverbeds, allowing for the formation of depositional features such as river deltas, alluvial fans, braided rivers, oxbow lakes, levees and coastal shores. The construction of a dam blocks the flow of sediment downstream, leading to downstream erosion of these sedimentary depositional environments, and increased sediment build-up in the reservoir. While the rate of sedimentation varies for each dam and each river, eventually all reservoirs develop a reduced water-storage capacity due to the exchange of "live storage" space for sediment. Diminished storage capacity results in decreased ability to produce hydroelectric power, reduced availability of water for irrigation, and if left unaddressed, may ultimately result in the expiration of the dam and river.

The trapping of sediment in reservoirs reduce sediment delivery downstream, which negatively impacts channel morphology, aquatic habitats and land elevation maintenance of deltas. Apart from dam removal, there are other strategies to mitigate reservoir sedimentation.

==== Flushing flow method ====
The flushing flow method involves partially or completely emptying the reservoir behind a dam to erode the sediment stored on the bottom and transport it downstream. Flushing flows aim to restore natural water and sediment fluxes in the river downstream of the dam, however the flushing flow method is less costly compared to removing dams or constructing bypass tunnels.

Flushing flows have been implemented in the Ebro river twice a year in autumn and spring since 2003, except for two dry years in 2004 and 2005. The construction of multiple dams on the Ebro river disrupted the delivery of sediments downstream and as a result, the Ebro delta faces a sediment deficit. The river channel also narrowed and bank erosion increased. During experiments, it was found that suspended sediment concentration during flushing flows is double that of natural floods, although the total water discharge is lower. This means that flushing flows have a relatively high sediment transport capacity, which in turn suggests that flushing flows positively impact downstream river ecosystems, maximising sediment delivery to the lowest reaches of the river. A total of 340,000 t/year of sediment could be delivered to the Ebro delta, which could result in a net accretion rate of 1 mm per year.

==== Sediment bypasses ====
Sediment bypass tunnels can partially restore sediment dynamics in rivers downstream of dams, and are primarily used in Japan and Switzerland. Bypass tunnels divert part of the incoming water and sediments during floods into a tunnel around a reservoir and dam. The water and sediment thus never enter the reservoir but join the river again below the dam. Bypass tunnels reduce riverbed erosion and increase morphological variability below the dam.

== Impact below dam ==
=== River line and coastal erosion ===
As all dams result in reduced sediment load downstream, a dammed river is greatly demanding for sediment as it will not have enough sediment. This is because the rate of deposition of sediment is greatly reduced since there is less to deposit but the rate of erosion remains nearly constant, the water flow erodes the river shores and riverbed, threatening shoreline ecosystems, deepening the riverbed, and narrowing the river over time. This leads to a compromised water table, reduced water levels, homogenization of the river flow and thus reduced ecosystem variability, reduced support for wildlife, and reduced amount of sediment reaching coastal plains and deltas. This prompts coastal erosion, as beaches are unable to replenish what waves erode without the sediment deposition of supporting river systems. Downstream channel erosion of dammed rivers is related to the morphology of the riverbed, which is different from directly studying the amounts of sedimentation because it is subject to specific long term conditions for each river system. For example, the eroded channel could create a lower water table level in the affected area, impacting bottomland crops such as alfalfa or corn, and resulting in a smaller supply. In the case of the Three Gorges Dam in China the changes described above now appears to have arrived at a new balance of erosion and sedimentation over a 10-year period in the lower reaches of the river. The impacts on the tidal region have also been linked to the upstream effects of the dam.

In addition to coastal erosion impacts, reduced river flow may also alter ocean currents and ecosystems.

=== Nutrients sequestration ===
Once a dam is put in place represents an obstacle to the flux of nutrients such as carbon (C), nitrogen (N), phosphorus (P), and silicon (Si) on downstream river, floodplains and delta. The increased residence time of these elements in the lentic system of a reservoir, compared to the lotic system of a river, promotes their sedimentation or elimination which can be up to 40%, 50%, and 60% for nitrogen, phosphorus and silica respectively and this ultimately changes nutrients stoichiometry in the aquatic ecosystem downstream a dam. The stochiometric imbalance of nitrogen, phosphorus, and silicon of the outflow can have repercussion on downstream ecosystems by shifting the phytoplankton community at the base of the food web with consequences to the whole aquatic population. An example is the effect of the construction of the Aswan High dam in Egypt, where the drop in nutrient concentration to the Nile delta impeded the diatom blooms causing a substantial decrease the fish population of Sardinella aurita and Sardinella eba, while the reduced load of mud and silt affected the micro-benthic fauna leading to the decline of shrimp population. The change in nutrients stoichiometry and silicon depletion at a river delta can also cause harmful algal and bacterial blooms to the detriment of diatoms' growth for whom silicon availability represents a milestone for shells' formation.

Since dammed rivers store nutrients during their lifespan, it can be expected that when a dam is removed, these legacy nutrients are remobilized causing downstream ecosystems' eutrophication and probable loss of biodiversity, thereby achieving the opposite effect desired by the river restoration action at dam dismissal.

=== Water temperature ===
The water of a deep reservoir in temperate climates typically stratifies with a large volume of cold, oxygen poor water in the hypolimnion. Analysis of temperature profiles from 11 large dams in the Murray Darling Basin (Australia) indicated differences between surface water and bottom water temperatures up to 16.7 degrees Celsius. If this water is released to maintain river flow, it can cause adverse impacts on the downstream ecosystem including fish populations. Under worse case conditions (such as when the reservoir is full or near full), the stored water is strongly stratified and large volumes of water are being released to the downstream river channel via bottom level outlets, depressed temperatures can be detected 250–350 kilometres (160–220 mi) downstream. The operators of Burrendong Dam on the Macquarie River (eastern Australia) are attempting to address thermal suppression by hanging a geotextile curtain around the existing outlet tower to force the selective release of surface water.

=== Natural ecosystems destroyed by agriculture ===
Many dams are built for irrigation and although there is an existing dry ecosystem downstream, it is deliberately destroyed in favor of irrigated farming. After the Aswan Dam was constructed in Egypt it protected Egypt from the droughts in 1972–1973 and 1983–1987 that devastated East and West Africa. The dam allowed Egypt to reclaim about 840,000 hectares in the Nile Delta and along the Nile Valley, increasing the country's irrigated area by a third. The increase was brought about both by irrigating what used to be desert and by bringing under cultivation 385,000 hectares that were natural flood retention basins. About half a million families were settled on these new lands. In 1983 the Franklin Dam project in Tasmania, Australia was cancelled following a campaign to protect surrounding forest from clearing and flooding.

=== Effects on flood-dependent ecology and agriculture ===
In many low lying developing countries the savanna and forest ecology adjacent to floodplains and river deltas are irrigated by wet season annual floods. Farmers annually plant flood recession crops, where the land is cultivated after floods recede to take advantage of the moist soil. Dams generally discourage this cultivation and prevent annual flooding, creating a dryer downstream ecology while providing a constant water supply for irrigation.

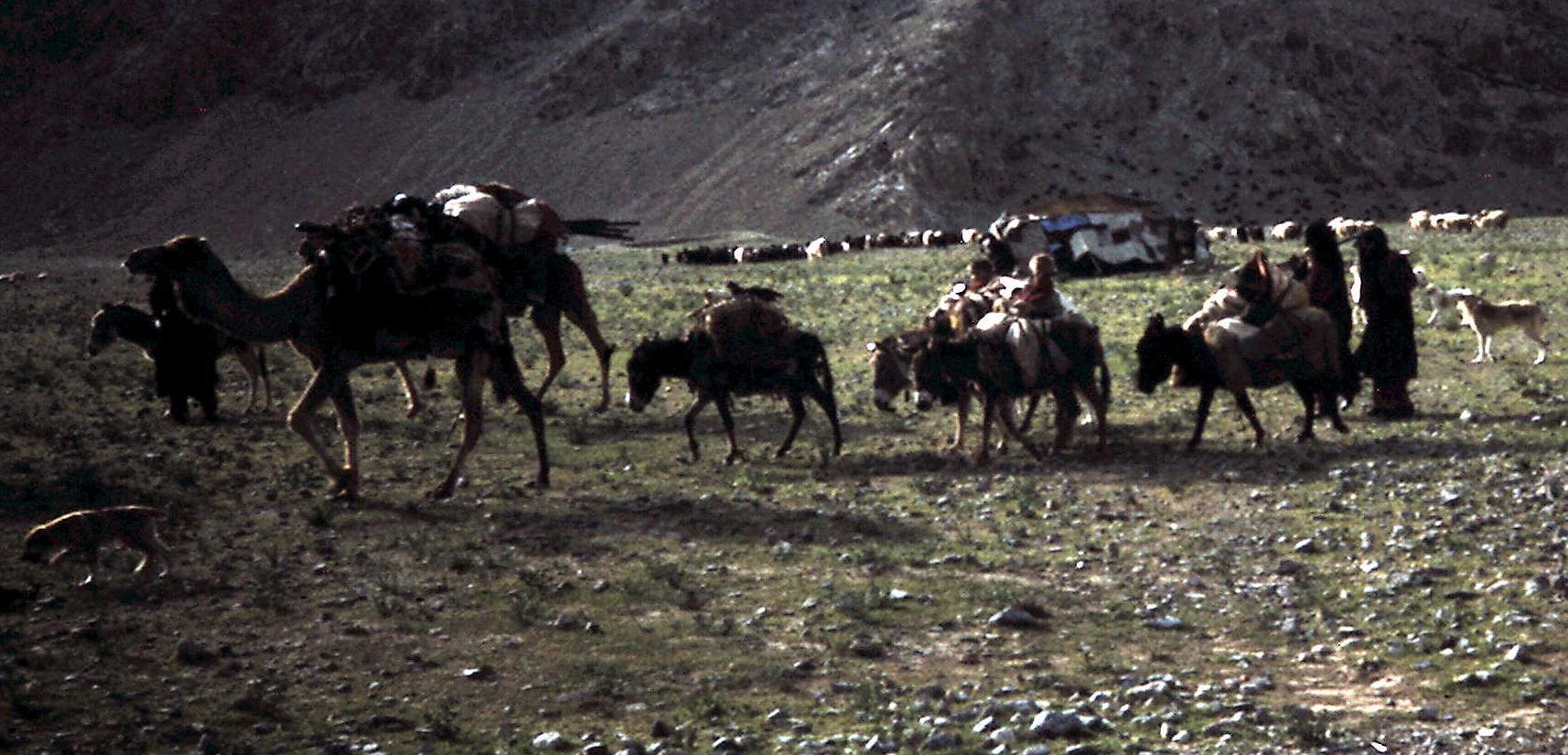
Water becomes scarce for nomadic pastoralist in Baluchistan due to new dam developments for irrigation.

Case studies

- The Lake Manatali reservoir formed by the Manantali Dam in Mali, West Africa intersects the migration routes of nomadic pastoralists and withholds water from the downstream savanna. The absence of the seasonal flood cycle causes depletion of grazing land, and is also drying the forests on the floodplain downstream of the dam.
- After the construction of the Kainji Dam in Nigeria, 50 to 70 percent of the downstream area of flood-recession cropping stopped.

=== Potential for disaster ===
Dams occasionally break causing catastrophic damage to communities downstream. Dams break due to engineering errors, attack or natural disaster. The greatest dam break disaster to date happened in China in 1975 killing 200,000 Chinese citizens. Other major failures during the 20th century were at Morbi, India (5,000 fatalities), at Vajont, Italy (2000 dead), while three other dam failures have each caused at least 1000 fatalities.

=== Flood control ===
The controversial Three Gorges Dam in China is able to store 22 cubic kilometres (5.3 cu mi) of floodwaters on the Yangtze River. The 1954 Yangtze River floods killed 33,000 people and displaced 18 million people from their homes. In 1998 a flood killed 4000 people and 180 million people were affected. The flooding of the reservoir caused over a million people to relocate, then a flood in August 2009 was completely captured by the new reservoir, protecting hundreds of millions of people downstream.

=== Mercury cycling and methylmercury production ===
The creation of reservoirs can alter the natural biogeochemical cycle of mercury. Studies conducted on the formation of an experimental reservoir by the flooding of a boreal wetland showed a 39-fold increase in the production of toxic methylmercury (MeHg) following the flooding. The increase in MeHg production only lasted about 2–3 years before returning to near normal levels. However, MeHg concentration in lower food chain organisms remained high and showed no signs of returning to pre-flood levels. The fate of MeHg during this time period is important when considering its potential to bioaccumulate in predatory fish.

== Effects beyond the reservoir ==
=== Effects on humans ===
Diseases
Whilst reservoirs are helpful to humans, they can also be harmful as well. One negative effect is that the reservoirs can become breeding grounds for disease vectors. This holds true especially in tropical areas where mosquitoes (which are vectors for malaria) and snails (which are vectors for schistosomiasis) can take advantage of this slow flowing water.

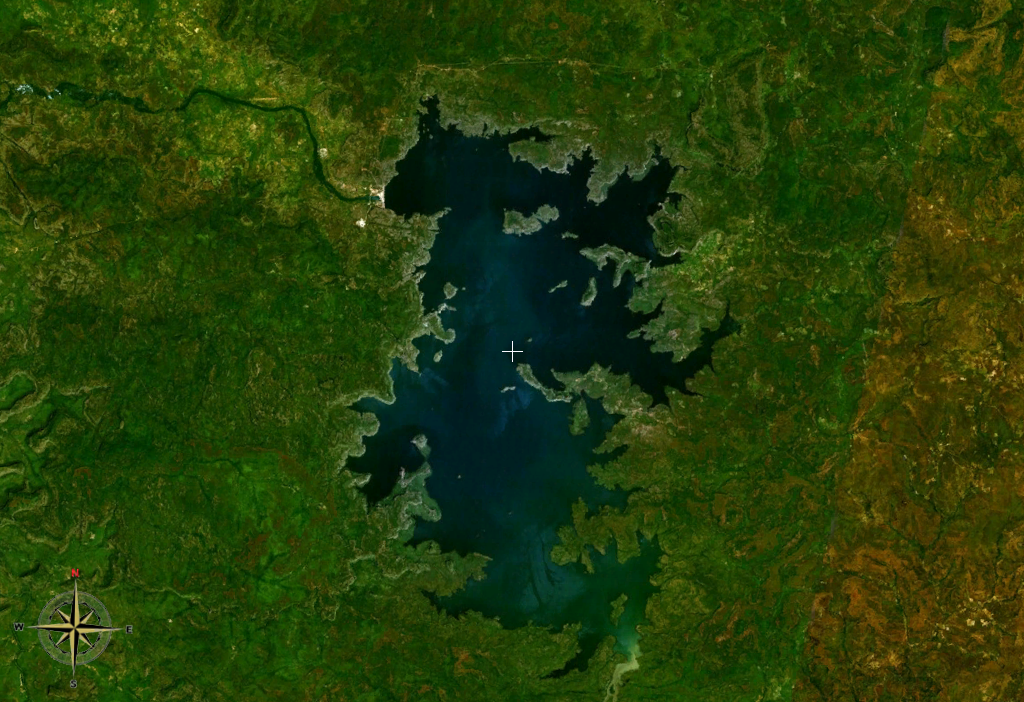
Lake Manantali, 477 km^{2}, displaced 12,000 people.

Resettlement
Dams and the creation of reservoirs also require relocation of potentially large human populations if they are constructed close to residential areas. The record for the largest population relocated belongs to the Three Gorges Dam built in China. Its reservoir submerged a large area of land, forcing over a million people to relocate. "Dam related relocation affects society in three ways: an economic disaster, human trauma, and social catastrophe", states Dr. Michael Cernea of the World Bank and Dr. Thayer Scudder, a professor at the California Institute of Technology. As well, as resettlement of communities, care must also be taken not to irreparably damage sites of historical or cultural value. The Aswan Dam forced the movement of the Temple at Aswan to prevent its destruction by the flooding of the reservoir.

=== Greenhouse gases ===
Reservoirs may contribute to changes in the Earth's climate. Warm climate reservoirs generate methane, a greenhouse gas when the reservoirs are stratified, in which the bottom layers are anoxic (i.e. they lack oxygen), leading to degradation of biomass through anaerobic processes. At a dam in Brazil, where the flooded basin is wide and the biomass volume is high the methane produced results in a pollution potential 3.5 times more than an oil-fired power plant would be. A theoretical study has indicated that globally hydroelectric reservoirs may emit 104 million metric tonnes of methane gas annually. Methane gas is a significant contributor to global climate change. This is not an isolated case, and it appears that especially hydroelectric dams constructed in lowland rainforest areas (where inundation of a part of the forest is necessary) produce large amounts of methane. Bruce Forsberg and Alexandre Kemenes have demonstrated that the Balbina Dam for instance emits 39,000 tonnes of methane each year and three other dams in the Amazon produce at least 3 to 4× as much CO_{2} as an equivalent coal-fired power plant. Reasons for this being that lowland rainforests are extremely productive and thus stores far more carbon than other forests. Also, microbes that digest rotting material grow better in hot climates, thus producing more greenhouse gases. Despite this, as of 2020, another 150 hydroelectric dams are planned to be constructed in the Amazon basin. There is some indication that greenhouse gas emissions decline over the lifetime of the dam. "But even including methane emissions, total GHG [Green-House Gas] per KWh generated from hydropower is still at least half that from the least polluting thermal alternatives.Thus, from the perspective of global warming mitigation, dams are the most attractive alternative to fossil fuel based energy sources."

Research conducted at the Experimental Lakes Area indicates that creating reservoirs through the flooding of boreal wetlands, which are sinks for CO_{2}, converts the wetlands into sources of atmospheric carbon. In these ecosystems, variation in organic carbon content has been found to have little effect on the rates of greenhouse gas emission. This means that other factors such as the lability of carbon compounds and temperature of the flooded soil are important to consider.

The following table indicates reservoir emissions in milligrams per square meter per day for different bodies of water.

| Location | Carbon Dioxide | Methane |
|---|---|---|
| Lakes | 700 | 9 |
| Temperate reservoirs | 1500 | 20 |
| Tropical reservoirs | 3000 | 100 |

== See also ==
- Akosombo Dam Impact
- Alta controversy
- Environmental impact of irrigation
- Environmental racism
- Fish barrier
- Fish ladder
- Renewable energy debate – Hydroelectricity
