= Ogive (disambiguation) =

An ogive is the roundly tapered end of a two-dimensional or three-dimensional object.

Ogive may also refer to:

- Ogives, a set of four piano pieces composed by Erik Satie
- Ogive (glacier), a banding feature of a glacier
- Eadgifu of Wessex, the daughter of Edward the Elder
- Ogive (statistics), a graph showing the curve of a cumulative distribution function
