= Ogive (statistics) =

Cumulative Frequency Graph

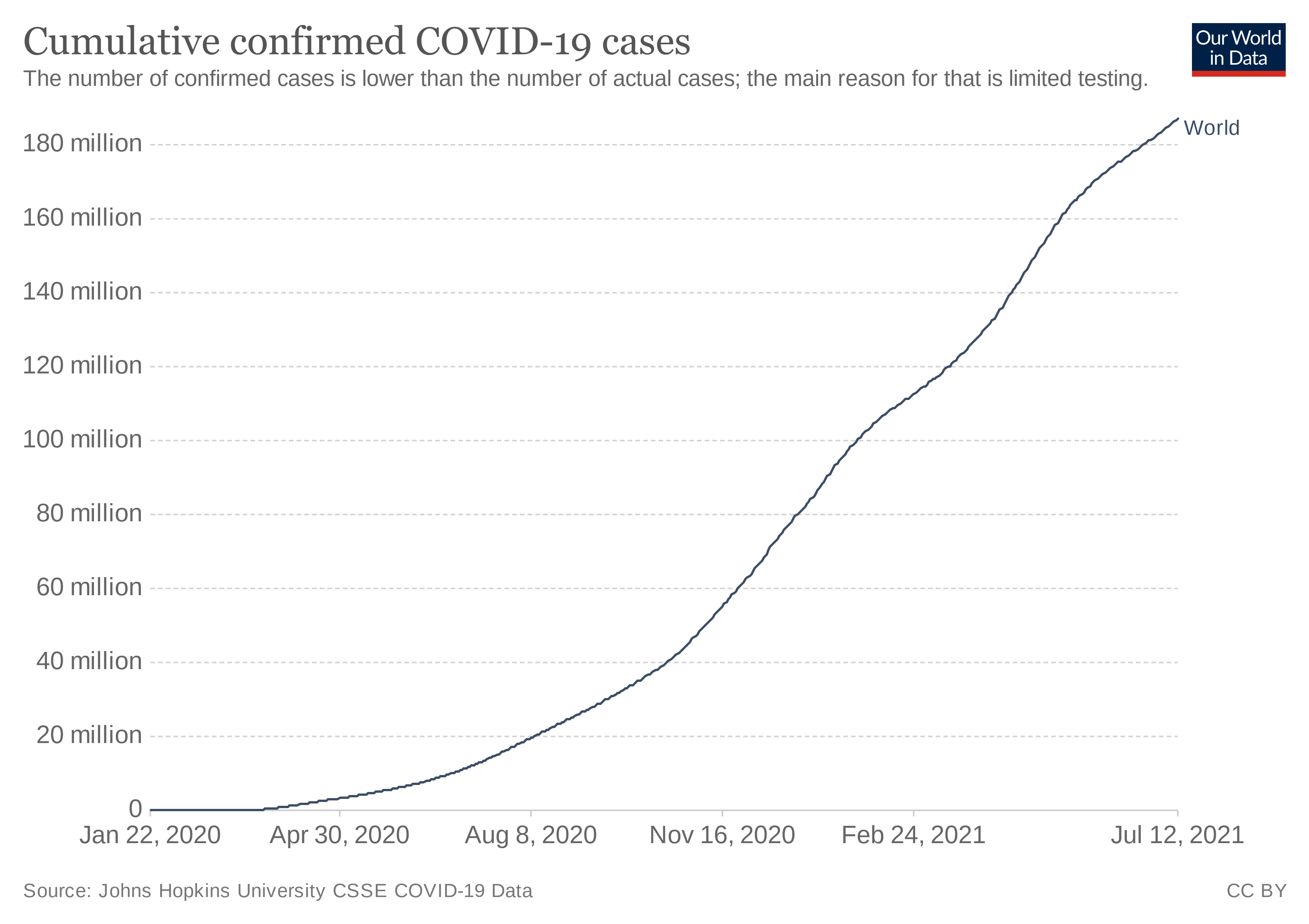
An ogive of confirmed COVID-19 cases recorded through July 18, 2020

In statistics, an ogive, also known as a cumulative frequency polygon, can refer to one of two things:

- any hand-drawn graphic of a cumulative distribution function
- any empirical cumulative distribution function.

The points plotted as part of an ogive are the upper class limit and the corresponding cumulative absolute frequency or cumulative relative frequency. The ogive for the normal distribution (on one side of the mean) resembles (one side of) an Arabesque or ogival arch, which is likely the origin of its name.

== Creation ==
Along the horizontal axis, the limits of the class intervals for an ogive are marked. Based on the limit values, points above each are placed with heights equal to either the absolute or relative cumulative frequency. The shape of an ogive is obtained by connecting each of the points to its neighbours with line segments. Sometimes an axis for both the absolute frequency and relative is drawn.

== Finding percentages ==
Ogives, similarly to other representations of cumulative distribution functions, are useful for estimating centiles in a distribution. For example, we can know the central point so that 50% of the observations would be below this point and 50% above. To do this, we draw a line from the point of 50% on the axis of percentage until it intersects with the curve. Then we vertically project the intersection onto the horizontal axis. The last intersection gives us the desired value. The frequency polygon and ogive are used to compare two statistical sets whose number could be different.

== See also ==
- Cumulative frequency analysis

== Bibliography ==
- Dodge, Yadolah (2008). The concise Encyclopedia of Statistics. Springer. p. 395. doi:10.1007/978-0-387-32833-1. ISBN 978-0-387-31742-7.
