= Residence time (disambiguation) =

Residence time is the time that a particle of matter spends in a system.

Residence time may also refer to:

- Residence time of lake water, the time that water spends in a particular lake
- Residence time (statistics), the average amount of time it takes for a random process to reach a certain boundary value
