= 100-year flood =

Indication of the likelihood of a flooding

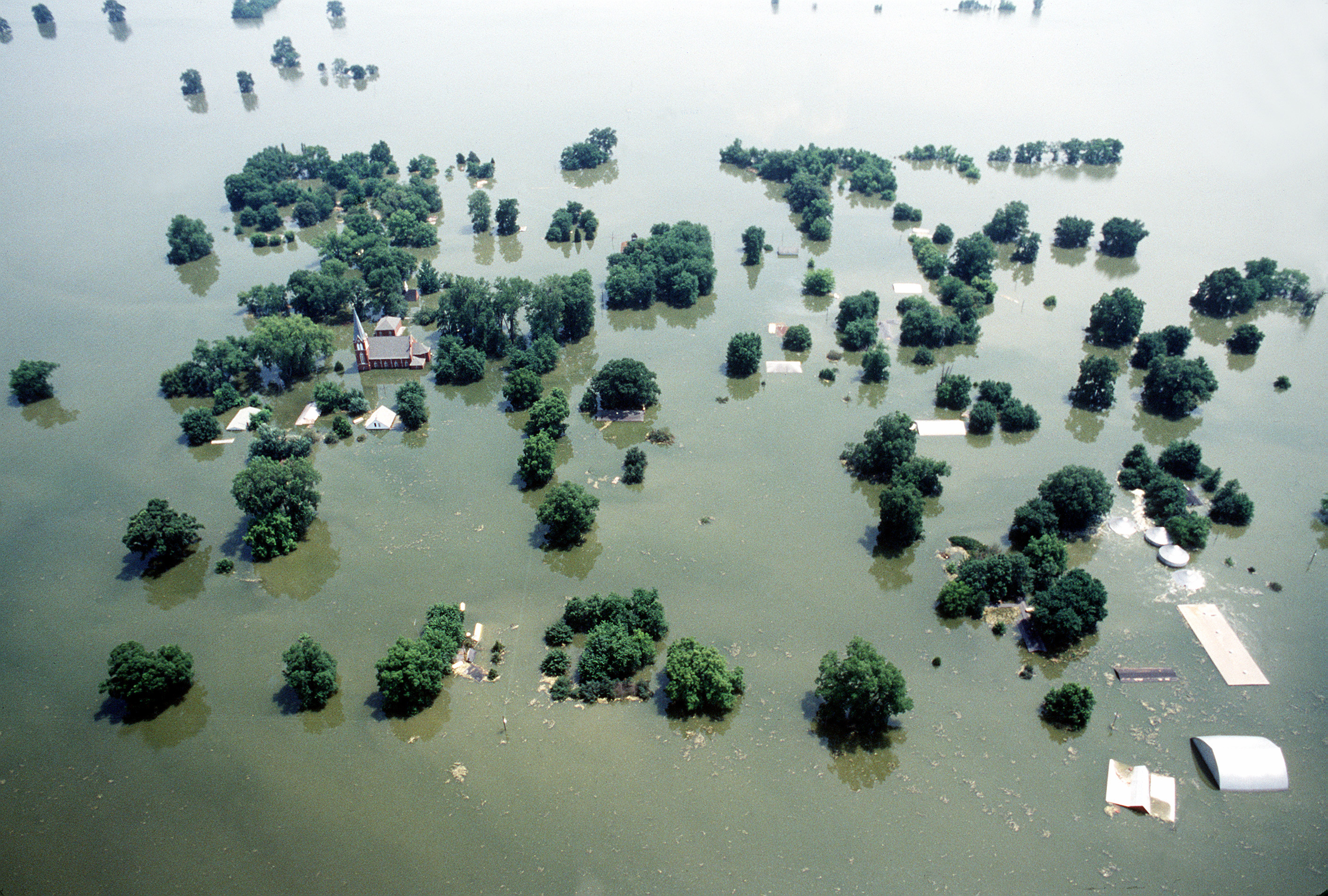
Mississippi River at Kaskaskia, Illinois, during the Great Flood of 1993

A 100-year flood, also called a 1% flood, or High Probability in the UK, is a flood event for a defined location at a level reached or exceeded once per hundred years, on average, but as there are many locations there are multiple independent 100-year floods within the same year. In the US, it is estimated on past records as having a 1 in 100 chance (1% probability) of being equaled or exceeded in any given year.

The estimated boundaries of inundation in a 100-year or 1% flood are marked on flood maps.

UK planning guidance defines Flood Zone 3a "High Probability" as Land having a 1% or greater annual probability of river flooding; or Land having a 0.5% or greater annual probability of sea.

== Maps, elevations and flow rates ==
For coastal flooding and lake flooding, a 100-year flood is generally expressed as a water level elevation or depth, and includes a combination of tide, storm surge, and waves.

For river systems, a 100-year flood can be expressed as a flow rate, from which the flood elevation is derived. The resulting area of inundation is referred to as the 100-year floodplain. Estimates of the 100-year flood flow rate and other streamflow statistics for any stream in the United States are available. A 100-year storm may or may not cause a 100-year flood, because of rainfall timing and location variations among different drainage basins, and independent causes of floods, such as snow melt and ice dams.

In the UK, the Environment Agency publishes a comprehensive map of all areas at risk of a 100-year flood. In the US, the Federal Emergency Management Agency publishes maps of the 100-year and 500-year floodplains.

Maps of the riverine or coastal 100-year floodplain may figure importantly in building permits, environmental regulations, and flood insurance. These analyses generally represent 20th-century climate and may underestimate the effects of climate change.

== Risk ==
Observed intervals between floods at Passau, 1501–2013

A common misunderstanding is that a 100-year flood happens once in a 100-year period. On average one happens per 100 years, five per 500 years, ten per thousand years. Any average hides variations. In any particular 100 years at one spot, there is a 37% chance that no 100-year flood happens, 37% chance that exactly one happens, and 26% chance that two or more happen. On the Danube River at Passau, Germany, the actual intervals between 100-year floods during 1501 to 2013 ranged from 37 to 192 years.

A related misunderstanding is that floods bigger than 100-year floods are too rare to be of concern. The 1% chance per year accumulates to 10% chance per decade, 26% chance during a 30-year mortgage, and 55% chance during an 80-year human lifetime. It is common to refer to 100-year floods as floods with 1% chance per year. It is equally true to refer to them as floods with 10% chance per decade.

Over a large diverse area, such as a large country or the world, in an average year 1% of watersheds have 100-year floods or bigger, and 0.1% of watersheds have 1,000-year floods or bigger. There are more in wet years, fewer in dry years. Of 1.6 million kilometers of coastline in the world, in an average year 1,600 kilometers have 1,000-year floods or bigger, more in stormy years, fewer in calmer years.

The US flood insurance program, starting in the 1960s, chose to foster rules in, and insure buildings in, 100-year floodplains, as "a fair balance between protecting the public and overly stringent regulation." After the North Sea flood of 1953, the United Kingdom mapped 1,000-year floods and the Netherlands raised its flood defenses to protect against up to 10,000 year floods. In 2017 the Netherlands designed some areas against million-year floods. The American Society of Civil Engineers recommends designing some structures for up to 1,000-year floods, while it recommends designing for up to 3,000-year winds. Per century, any one area has a 63% chance of a 100-year flood or worse, 10% chance of a 1,000-year flood, 1% chance of a 10,000-year flood, and 0.01% chance of a million-year flood. As David van Dantzig, working on the government response to the 1953 flood, said, "One will surely be willing to spend a multiple of the amount that would be lost by a flood if the flood can thereby be prevented."

== Flood insurance ==
In the United States, the 100-year flood provides the risk basis for flood insurance rates. A regulatory flood or base flood is routinely established for river reaches through a science-based rule-making process targeted to a 100-year flood at the historical average recurrence interval. In addition to historical flood data, the process accounts for previously established regulatory values, the effects of flood-control reservoirs, and changes in land use in the watershed. Coastal flood hazards have been mapped by a similar approach that includes the relevant physical processes. Most areas where serious floods can occur in the United States have been mapped consistently in this manner. On average nationwide, those 100-year flood estimates are sufficient for the purposes of the National Flood Insurance Program (NFIP) and offer reasonable estimates of future flood risk, if the future is like the past. Approximately 3% of the U.S. population lives in areas subject to the 1% annual chance coastal flood hazard.

In theory, removing homes and businesses from areas that flood repeatedly can protect people and reduce insurance losses, but in practice it is difficult for people to retreat from established neighborhoods.

== Probability ==
The probability P_{e} that one or more floods occurring during any period will exceed a given flood threshold can be expressed, using the binomial distribution, as

$$P_{e}=1-\left[ 1-\left( \frac{1}{T} \right) \right]^{n}$$

where T is the threshold mean recurrence interval (e.g. 100-yr, 50-yr, 25-yr, and so forth), greater than 1. If T is in years, then n is the number of years in the period, and P_{e} is the chance per year, Annual Exceedance Probability.

The formula can be understood as:

- Chance per year of a T-year flood is 1/T for example 1/100 = 0.01
- Chance per year of no such flood is 1 − 1/T for example 1 − 0.01 = 0.99
- Chance that n independent years have no such flood, by multiplying, is (1 − 1/T)^{n} for example 0.99^{100} = 0.366
- Chance of at least one flood in n years is 1 − (1 − 1/T)^{n} for example 1 − 0.99^{100} = 0.634 = 63.4%

The probability of exceedance P_{e} is also described as the natural, inherent, or hydrologic risk of failure. However, the expected value of the number of 100-year floods occurring in any 100-year period is 1.

Ten-year floods have a 10% chance of occurring in any given year (P_{e} =0.10); 500-year floods have a 0.2% chance of occurring in any given year (P_{e} =0.002); etc. The percent chance of a T-year flood occurring in a single year is 100/T, where T is bigger than 1.

During this many years, chance of at least one storm of severity shown on left, or worse
Storm with chance shown below, of being equaled or exceeded each year	1 year	10 years	30 years	50 years	80 years	100 years	200 years
1/100	1.0%	9.6%	26.0%	39.5%	55.2%	63.4%	86.6%
1/500	0.2%	2.0%	5.8%	9.5%	14.8%	18.1%	33.0%
1/1,000	0.1%	1.0%	3.0%	4.9%	7.7%	9.5%	18.1%
1/10,000	0.0%	0.10%	0.30%	0.50%	0.80%	1.00%	1.98%
1/1,000,000	0.0001%	0.001%	0.003%	0.005%	0.008%	0.010%	0.020%

The same formula above can give the chance of occurrence in less than a year. A 1-year flood is a 12-month flood, with a 1/12 chance each month, and the formula in months shows 65% chance each year.

The field of extreme value theory was created to model rare events such as 100-year floods for the purposes of civil engineering. This theory is most commonly applied to the maximum or minimum observed stream flows of a given river. In desert areas where there are only ephemeral washes, this method is applied to the maximum observed flow over a given period of time (24-hours, 6-hours, or 3-hours). The extreme value analysis only considers the most extreme event observed in a given year. So, between the large spring runoff and a heavy summer rain storm, whichever resulted in more runoff would be considered the extreme event, while the smaller event would be ignored in the analysis (even though both may have been capable of causing terrible flooding in their own right).

== Statistical assumptions ==
There are a number of assumptions that are made to complete the analysis that determines the 100-year flood. First, the extreme events observed in each year must be independent from year to year. In other words, the maximum river flow rate from 1984 cannot be found to be significantly correlated with the observed flow rate in 1985, which cannot be correlated with 1986, and so forth. The second assumption is that the observed extreme events must come from the same probability density function. The third assumption is that the probability distribution relates to the largest storm (rainfall or river flow rate measurement) that occurs in any one year. The fourth assumption is that the probability distribution function is stationary, meaning that the mean (average), standard deviation and maximum and minimum values are not increasing or decreasing over time. This concept is referred to as stationarity.

The first assumption is often but not always valid and should be tested on a case-by-case basis. The second assumption is often valid if the extreme events are observed under similar climate conditions. For example, if the extreme events on record all come from late summer thunderstorms (as is the case in the southwest U.S.), or from snow pack melting (as is the case in north-central U.S.), then this assumption should be valid. If, however, there are some extreme events taken from thunder storms, others from snow pack melting, and others from hurricanes, then this assumption is most likely not valid. The third assumption is only a problem when trying to forecast a low, but maximum flow event (for example, an event smaller than a 2-year flood). Since this is not typically a goal in extreme analysis, or in civil engineering design, then the situation rarely presents itself.

The final assumption about stationarity is difficult to test from data for a single site because of the large uncertainties in even the longest flood records (see next section). More broadly, substantial evidence of climate change strongly suggests that the probability distribution is also changing and that managing flood risks in the future will become even more difficult. The simplest implication of this is that most of the historical data represent 20th-century climate and might not be valid for extreme event analysis in the 21st century.

== Probability uncertainty ==
When these assumptions are violated, there is an unknown amount of uncertainty introduced into the reported value of what the 100-year flood means in terms of rainfall intensity, or flood depth. When all of the inputs are known, the uncertainty can be measured in the form of a confidence interval. For example, one might say there is a 95% chance that the 100-year flood is greater than X, but less than Y.

Direct statistical analysis to estimate the 100-year riverine flood is possible only at the relatively few locations where an annual series of maximum instantaneous flood discharges has been recorded. In the United States as of 2014, taxpayers have supported such records for at least 60 years at fewer than 2,600 locations, for at least 90 years at fewer than 500, and for at least 120 years at only 11. For comparison, the total area of the nation is about 3,800,000 square miles (9,800,000 km^{2}), so there are perhaps 3,000 stream reaches that drain watersheds of 1,000 square miles (2,600 km^{2}) and 300,000 reaches that drain 10 square miles (26 km^{2}). In urban areas, 100-year flood estimates are needed for watersheds as small as 1 square mile (2.6 km^{2}). For reaches without sufficient data for direct analysis, 100-year flood estimates are derived from indirect statistical analysis of flood records at other locations in a hydrologically similar region or from other hydrologic models. Similarly for coastal floods, tide gauge data exist for only about 1,450 sites worldwide, of which only about 950 added information to the global data center between January 2010 and March 2016.

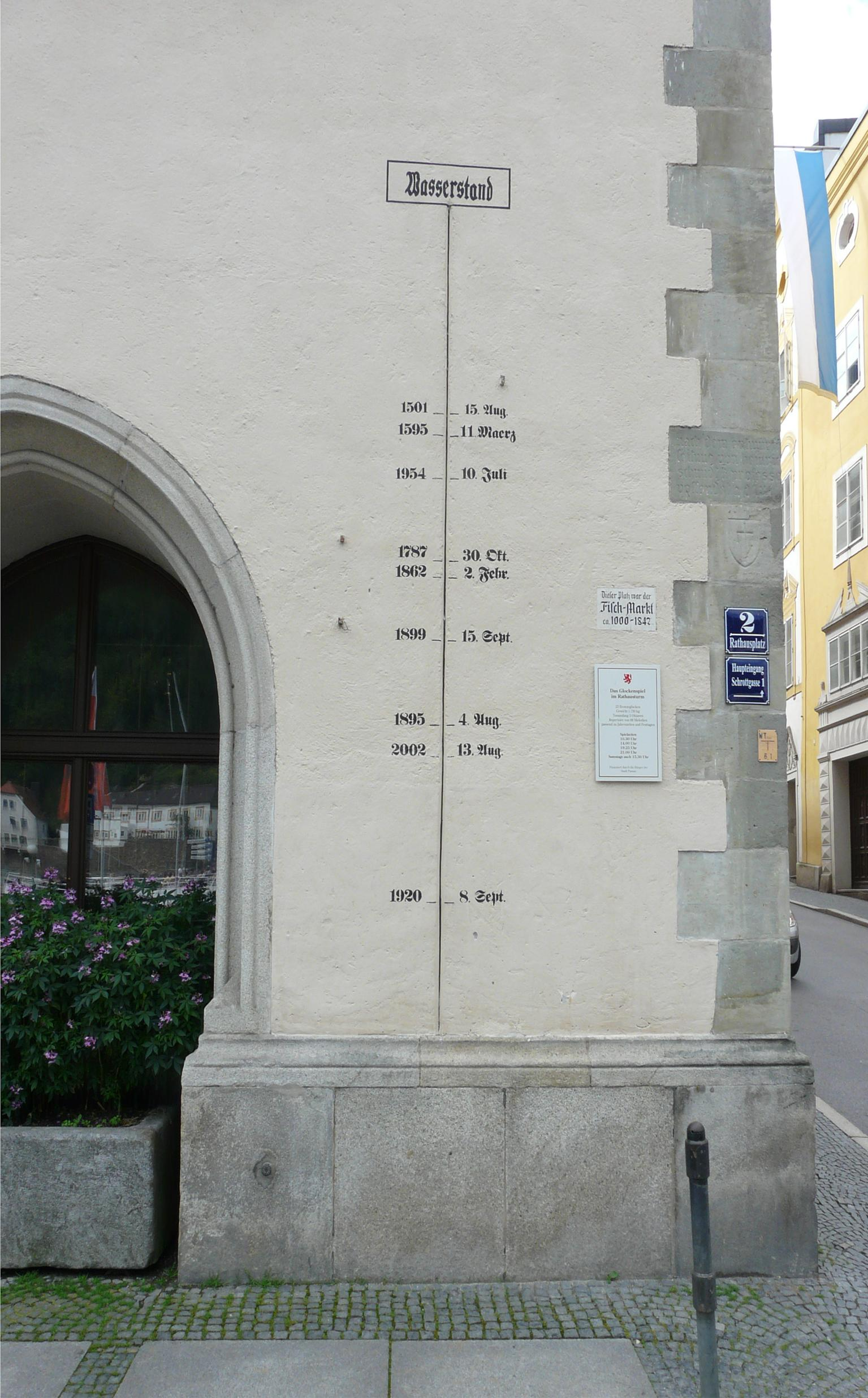
High-water scale 1501–2002 at Passau, Germany, as of September 2012

Much longer records of flood elevations exist at a few locations around the world, such as the Danube River at Passau, Germany, but they must be evaluated carefully for accuracy and completeness before any statistical interpretation.

For an individual stream reach, the uncertainties in any analysis can be large, so 100-year flood estimates have large individual uncertainties for most stream reaches. For the largest recorded flood at any specific location, or any potentially larger event, the recurrence interval always is poorly known. Spatial variability adds more uncertainty, because a flood peak observed at different locations on the same stream during the same event commonly represents a different recurrence interval at each location. If an extreme storm drops enough rain on one branch of a river to cause a 100-year flood, but no rain falls over another branch, the flood wave downstream from their junction might have a recurrence interval of only 10 years. Conversely, a storm that produces a 25-year flood simultaneously in each branch might form a 100-year flood downstream. During a time of flooding, news accounts necessarily simplify the story by reporting the greatest damage and largest recurrence interval estimated at any location. The public can easily and incorrectly conclude that the recurrence interval applies to all stream reaches in the flood area.

== Observed intervals between floods ==
Peak elevations of 14 floods as early as 1501 on the Danube River at Passau, Germany, reveal great variability in the actual intervals between floods. Flood events greater than the 50-year flood occurred at intervals of 4 to 192 years since 1501, and the 50-year flood of 2002 was followed only 11 years later by a 500-year flood. Only half of the intervals between 50- and 100-year floods were within 50 percent of the nominal average interval. Similarly, the intervals between 5-year floods during 1955 to 2007 ranged from 5 months to 16 years, and only half were within 2.5 to 7.5 years.

== See also ==
- Extreme value theory
- Extreme weather
- Flood forecasting
- Frequency of exceedance
- List of floods
- Lists of floods in the United States
