= Residence time (statistics) =

Statistical parameter of random process evolution

In statistics, the residence time is the average amount of time it takes for a random process to reach a certain boundary value, usually a boundary far from the mean.

== Definition ==
Suppose y(t) is a real, scalar stochastic process with initial value y(t_{0}) = y_{0}, mean y_{avg} and two critical values {y_{avg} − y_{min}, y_{avg} + y_{max}}, where y_{min} > 0 and y_{max} > 0. Define the first passage time of y(t) from within the interval (−y_{min}, y_{max}) as

$$\tau(y_0) = \inf\{t \ge t_0 : y(t) \in \{y_{\operatorname{avg}}-y_{\min},\ y_{\operatorname{avg}}+y_{\max}\} \},$$

where "inf" is the infimum. This is the smallest time after the initial time t_{0} that y(t) is equal to one of the critical values forming the boundary of the interval, assuming y_{0} is within the interval.

Because y(t) proceeds randomly from its initial value to the boundary, τ(y_{0}) is itself a random variable. The mean of τ(y_{0}) is the residence time,

$$\bar{\tau}(y_0) = E[\tau(y_0)\mid y_0].$$

For a Gaussian process and a boundary far from the mean, the residence time equals the inverse of the frequency of exceedance of the smaller critical value,

$$\bar{\tau} = N^{-1}(\min(y_{\min},\ y_{\max})),$$

where the frequency of exceedance N is

| $N(y_{\max}) = N_0 e^{-y_{\max}^2/2\sigma_y^2},$ | 1 |

σ_{y}^{2} is the variance of the Gaussian distribution,

$$N_0 = \sqrt{\frac{\int_0^\infty{f^2 \Phi_y(f) \, df}}{\int_0^\infty{\Phi_y(f) \, df}}},$$

and Φ_{y}(f) is the power spectral density of the Gaussian distribution over a frequency f.

=== Generalization to multiple dimensions ===
Suppose that instead of being scalar, y(t) has dimension p, or $y(t) \isin \mathbb{R}^p$. Define a domain $\Psi \subset \mathbb{R}^p$ that contains y_{avg} and has a smooth boundary ∂Ψ. In this case, define the first passage time of y(t) from within the domain Ψ as

$$\tau(y_0) = \inf\{t \ge t_0 : y(t) \in \partial \Psi \mid y_0 \in \Psi \}.$$

In this case, this infimum is the smallest time at which y(t) is on the boundary of Ψ rather than being equal to one of two discrete values, assuming y_{0} is within Ψ. The mean of this time is the residence time,

$$\bar{\tau}(y_0) = \operatorname{E}[\tau(y_0)\mid y_0].$$

=== Logarithmic residence time ===
The logarithmic residence time is a dimensionless variation of the residence time. It is proportional to the natural log of a normalized residence time. Noting the exponential in Equation (1), the logarithmic residence time of a Gaussian process is defined as

$$\hat{\mu} = \ln \left(N_0 \bar{\tau} \right) = \frac{\min(y_{\min},\ y_{\max})^2}{2 \sigma_y^2}.$$

This is closely related to another dimensionless descriptor of this system, the number of standard deviations between the boundary and the mean, min(y_{min}, y_{max})/σ_{y}.

In general, the normalization factor N_{0} can be difficult or impossible to compute, so the dimensionless quantities can be more useful in applications.

== See also ==
- Cumulative frequency analysis
- Extreme value theory
- First-hitting-time model
- Frequency of exceedance
- Mean time between failures
