= Frequency of exceedance =

Rate at which a threshold is exceeded

The frequency of exceedance, sometimes called the annual rate of exceedance, is the frequency with which a random process exceeds some critical value. Typically, the critical value is far from the mean. It is usually defined in terms of the number of peaks of the random process that are outside the boundary. It has applications related to predicting extreme events, such as major earthquakes and floods.

== Definition ==
The frequency of exceedance is the number of times a stochastic process exceeds some critical value, usually a critical value far from the process' mean, per unit time. Counting exceedance of the critical value can be accomplished either by counting peaks of the process that exceed the critical value or by counting upcrossings of the critical value, where an upcrossing is an event where the instantaneous value of the process crosses the critical value with positive slope. This article assumes the two methods of counting exceedance are equivalent and that the process has one upcrossing and one peak per exceedance. However, processes, especially continuous processes with high frequency components to their power spectral densities, may have multiple upcrossings or multiple peaks in rapid succession before the process reverts to its mean.

== Frequency of exceedance for a Gaussian process ==
Consider a scalar, zero-mean Gaussian process y(t) with variance σ_{y}^{2} and power spectral density Φ_{y}(f), where f is a frequency. Over time, this Gaussian process has peaks that exceed some critical value y_{max} > 0. Counting the number of upcrossings of y_{max}, the frequency of exceedance of y_{max} is given by

$$N(y_{\max}) = N_0 e^{-\tfrac{1}{2}\left(\tfrac{y_{\max}}{\sigma_y}\right)^2}.$$

N_{0} is the frequency of upcrossings of 0 and is related to the power spectral density as

$$N_0 = \sqrt{\frac{\int_0^\infty{f^2 \Phi_y(f) \, df}}{\int_0^\infty{\Phi_y(f) \, df}}}.$$

For a Gaussian process, the approximation that the number of peaks above the critical value and the number of upcrossings of the critical value are the same is good for y_{max}/σ_{y} > 2 and for narrow band noise.

For power spectral densities that decay less steeply than f^{−3} as f→∞, the integral in the numerator of N_{0} does not converge. Hoblit gives methods for approximating N_{0} in such cases with applications aimed at continuous gusts.

== Time and probability of exceedance ==
As the random process evolves over time, the number of peaks that exceeded the critical value y_{max} grows and is itself a counting process. For many types of distributions of the underlying random process, including Gaussian processes, the number of peaks above the critical value y_{max} converges to a Poisson process as the critical value becomes arbitrarily large. The interarrival times of this Poisson process are exponentially distributed with rate of decay equal to the frequency of exceedance N(y_{max}). Thus, the mean time between peaks, including the residence time or mean time before the very first peak, is the inverse of the frequency of exceedance N^{−1}(y_{max}).

If the number of peaks exceeding y_{max} grows as a Poisson process, then the probability that at time t there has not yet been any peak exceeding y_{max} is e^{−N(y_{max})t}. Its complement,

$$p_{ex}(t) = 1 - e^{-N(y_{\max})t},$$

is the probability of exceedance, the probability that y_{max} has been exceeded at least once by time t. This probability can be useful to estimate whether an extreme event will occur during a specified time period, such as the lifespan of a structure or the duration of an operation.

If N(y_{max})t is small, for example for the frequency of a rare event occurring in a short time period, then

$$p_{ex}(t) \approx N(y_{\max})t.$$

Under this assumption, the frequency of exceedance is equal to the probability of exceedance per unit time, p_{ex}/t, and the probability of exceedance can be computed by simply multiplying the frequency of exceedance by the specified length of time.

== Applications ==
- Probability of major earthquakes
- Weather forecasting
- Hydrology and loads on hydraulic structures
- Gust loads on aircraft

== See also ==
- 100-year flood
- Cumulative frequency analysis
- Extreme value theory
- Percentile score
- Rice's formula
