= Catalog of articles in probability theory =

This page lists articles related to probability theory. In particular, it lists many articles corresponding to specific probability distributions. Such articles are marked here by a code of the form (X:Y), which refers to number of random variables involved and the type of the distribution. For example (2:DC) indicates a distribution with two random variables, discrete or continuous. Other codes are just abbreviations for topics. The list of codes can be found in the table of contents.

== Core probability: selected topics ==
Probability theory

=== Basic notions (bsc) ===
- Random variable
- Continuous probability distribution / (1:C)
- Cumulative distribution function / (1:DCR)
- Discrete probability distribution / (1:D)
- Independent and identically-distributed random variables / (FS:BDCR)
- Joint probability distribution / (F:DC)
- Marginal distribution / (2F:DC)
- Probability density function / (1:C)
- Probability distribution / (1:DCRG)
- Probability distribution function
- Probability mass function / (1:D)
- Sample space

=== Instructive examples (paradoxes) (iex) ===
- Berkson's paradox / (2:B)
- Bertrand's box paradox / (F:B)
- Borel–Kolmogorov paradox / cnd (2:CM)
- Boy or Girl paradox / (2:B)
- Exchange paradox / (2:D)
- Intransitive dice
- Monty Hall problem / (F:B)
- Necktie paradox
- Simpson's paradox
- Sleeping Beauty problem
- St. Petersburg paradox / mnt (1:D)
- Three Prisoners problem
- Two envelopes problem

=== Moments (mnt) ===
- Expected value / (12:DCR)
- Canonical correlation / (F:R)
- Carleman's condition / anl (1:R)
- Central moment / (1:R)
- Coefficient of variation / (1:R)
- Correlation / (2:R)
- Correlation function / (U:R)
- Covariance / (2F:R) (1:G)
- Covariance function / (U:R)
- Covariance matrix / (F:R)
- Cumulant / (12F:DCR)
- Factorial moment / (1:R)
- Factorial moment generating function / anl (1:R)
- Fano factor
- Geometric standard deviation / (1:R)
- Hamburger moment problem / anl (1:R)
- Hausdorff moment problem / anl (1:R)
- Isserlis Gaussian moment theorem / Gau
- Jensen's inequality / (1:DCR)
- Kurtosis / (1:CR)
- Law of the unconscious statistician / (1:DCR)
- Moment / (12FU:CRG)
- Law of total covariance / (F:R)
- Law of total cumulance / (F:R)
- Law of total expectation / (F:DR)
- Law of total variance / (F:R)
- Logmoment generating function
- Marcinkiewicz–Zygmund inequality / inq
- Method of moments / lmt (L:R)
- Moment problem / anl (1:R)
- Moment-generating function / anl (1F:R)
- Second moment method / (1FL:DR)
- Skewness / (1:R)
- St. Petersburg paradox / iex (1:D)
- Standard deviation / (1:DCR)
- Standardized moment / (1:R)
- Stieltjes moment problem / anl (1:R)
- Trigonometric moment problem / anl (1:R)
- Uncorrelated / (2:R)
- Variance / (12F:DCR)
- Variance-to-mean ratio / (1:R)

=== Inequalities (inq) ===
- Chebyshev's inequality / (1:R)
- An inequality on location and scale parameters / (1:R)
- Azuma's inequality / (F:BR)
- Bennett's inequality / (F:R)
- Bernstein inequalities / (F:R)
- Bhatia–Davis inequality
- Chernoff bound / (F:B)
- Doob's martingale inequality / (FU:R)
- Dudley's theorem / Gau
- Entropy power inequality
- Etemadi's inequality / (F:R)
- Gauss's inequality
- Hoeffding's inequality / (F:R)
- Khintchine inequality / (F:B)
- Kolmogorov's inequality / (F:R)
- Marcinkiewicz–Zygmund inequality / mnt
- Markov's inequality / (1:R)
- McDiarmid's inequality
- Multidimensional Chebyshev's inequality
- Paley–Zygmund inequality / (1:R)
- Pinsker's inequality / (2:R)
- Vysochanskiï–Petunin inequality / (1:C)

=== Markov chains, processes, fields, networks (Mar) ===
- Markov chain / (FLSU:D)
- Additive Markov chain
- Bayesian network / Bay
- Birth–death process / (U:D)
- CIR process / scl
- Chapman–Kolmogorov equation / (F:DC)
- Cheeger bound / (L:D)
- Conductance
- Contact process
- Continuous-time Markov process / (U:D)
- Detailed balance / (F:D)
- Examples of Markov chains / (FL:D)
- Feller process / (U:G)
- Fokker–Planck equation / scl anl
- Foster's theorem / (L:D)
- Gauss–Markov process / Gau
- Geometric Brownian motion / scl
- Hammersley–Clifford theorem / (F:C)
- Harris chain / (L:DC)
- Hidden Markov model / (F:D)
- Hidden Markov random field
- Hunt process / (U:R)
- Kalman filter / (F:C)
- Kolmogorov backward equation / scl
- Kolmogorov's criterion / (F:D)
- Kolmogorov's generalized criterion / (U:D)
- Krylov–Bogolyubov theorem / anl
- Lumpability
- Markov additive process
- Markov blanket / Bay
- Markov chain mixing time / (L:D)
- Markov decision process
- Markov information source
- Markov kernel
- Markov logic network
- Markov network
- Markov process / (U:D)
- Markov property / (F:D)
- Markov random field
- Master equation / phs (U:D)
- Milstein method / scl
- Moran process
- Ornstein–Uhlenbeck process / Gau scl
- Partially observable Markov decision process
- Product-form solution / spr
- Quantum Markov chain / phs
- Semi-Markov process
- Stochastic matrix / anl
- Telegraph process / (U:B)
- Variable-order Markov model
- Wiener process / Gau scl

=== Gaussian random variables, vectors, functions (Gau) ===
- Normal distribution / spd
- Abstract Wiener space
- Brownian bridge
- Classical Wiener space
- Concentration dimension
- Dudley's theorem / inq
- Estimation of covariance matrices
- Fractional Brownian motion
- Gaussian isoperimetric inequality
- Gaussian measure / anl
- Gaussian random field
- Gauss–Markov process / Mar
- Integration of the normal density function / spd anl
- Gaussian process
- Isserlis Gaussian moment theorem / mnt
- Karhunen–Loève theorem
- Large deviations of Gaussian random functions / lrd
- Lévy's modulus of continuity theorem / (U:R)
- Matrix normal distribution / spd
- Multivariate normal distribution / spd
- Ornstein–Uhlenbeck process / Mar scl
- Paley–Wiener integral / anl
- Pregaussian class
- Schilder's theorem / lrd
- Wiener process / Mar scl

=== Conditioning (cnd) ===
- Conditioning / (2:BDCR)
- Bayes' theorem / (2:BCG)
- Borel–Kolmogorov paradox / iex (2:CM)
- Conditional expectation / (2:BDR)
- Conditional independence / (3F:BR)
- Conditional probability
- Conditional probability distribution / (2:DC)
- Conditional random field / (F:R)
- Disintegration theorem / anl (2:G)
- Inverse probability / Bay
- Luce's choice axiom
- Regular conditional probability / (2:G)
- Rule of succession / (F:B)

=== Specific distributions (spd) ===
- Binomial distribution / (1:D)
- (a,b,0) class of distributions / (1:D)
- Anscombe transform
- Bernoulli distribution / (1:B)
- Beta distribution / (1:C)
- Bose–Einstein statistics / (F:D)
- Cantor distribution / (1:C)
- Cauchy distribution / (1:C)
- Chi-squared distribution / (1:C)
- Compound Poisson distribution / (F:DR)
- Degenerate distribution / (1:D)
- Dirichlet distribution / (F:C)
- Discrete phase-type distribution / (1:D)
- Erlang distribution / (1:C)
- Exponential-logarithmic distribution / (1:C)
- Exponential distribution / (1:C)
- F-distribution / (1:C)
- Fermi–Dirac statistics / (1F:D)
- Fisher–Tippett distribution / (1:C)
- Gamma distribution / (1:C)
- Generalized normal distribution / (1:C)
- Geometric distribution / (1:D)
- Half circle distribution / (1:C)
- Hypergeometric distribution / (1:D)
- Normal distribution / Gau
- Integration of the normal density function / Gau anl
- Lévy distribution / (1:C)
- Matrix normal distribution / Gau
- Maxwell–Boltzmann statistics / (F:D)
- McCullagh's parametrization of the Cauchy distributions / (1:C)
- Multinomial distribution / (F:D)
- Multivariate normal distribution / Gau
- Negative binomial distribution / (1:D)
- Pareto distribution / (1:C)
- Phase-type distribution / (1:C)
- Poisson distribution / (1:D)
- Power law / (1:C)
- Skew normal distribution / (1:C)
- Stable distribution / (1:C)
- Student's t-distribution / (1:C)
- Tracy–Widom distribution / rmt
- Triangular distribution / (1:C)
- Weibull distribution / (1:C)
- Wigner semicircle distribution / (1:C)
- Wishart distribution / (F:C)
- Zeta distribution / (1:D)
- Zipf's law / (1:D)

=== Empirical measure (emm) ===
- Donsker's theorem / (LU:C)
- Empirical distribution function
- Empirical measure / (FL:RG) (U:D)
- Empirical process / (FL:RG) (U:D)
- Glivenko–Cantelli theorem / (FL:RG) (U:D)
- Khmaladze transformation / (FL:RG) (U:D)
- Vapnik–Chervonenkis theory

=== Limit theorems (lmt) ===
- Central limit theorem / (L:R)
- Berry–Esseen theorem / (F:R)
- Characteristic function / anl (1F:DCR)
- De Moivre–Laplace theorem / (L:BD)
- Helly–Bray theorem / anl (L:R)
- Illustration of the central limit theorem / (L:DC)
- Lindeberg's condition
- Lyapunov's central limit theorem / (L:R)
- Lévy's continuity theorem / anl (L:R)
- Lévy's convergence theorem / (S:R)
- Martingale central limit theorem / (S:R)
- Method of moments / mnt (L:R)
- Slutsky's theorem / anl
- Weak convergence of measures / anl

=== Large deviations (lrd) ===
- Large deviations theory
- Contraction principle
- Cramér's theorem
- Exponentially equivalent measures
- Freidlin–Wentzell theorem
- Laplace principle
- Large deviations of Gaussian random functions / Gau
- Rate function
- Schilder's theorem / Gau
- Tilted large deviation principle
- Varadhan's lemma

=== Random graphs (rgr) ===
- Random graph
- BA model
- Barabási–Albert model
- Erdős–Rényi model
- Percolation theory / phs (L:B)
- Percolation threshold / phs
- Random geometric graph
- Random regular graph
- Watts and Strogatz model

=== Random matrices (rmt) ===
- Random matrix
- Circular ensemble
- Gaussian matrix ensemble
- Tracy–Widom distribution / spd
- Weingarten function / anl

=== Stochastic calculus (scl) ===
- Itô calculus
- Bessel process
- CIR process / Mar
- Doléans-Dade exponential
- Dynkin's formula
- Euler–Maruyama method
- Feynman–Kac formula
- Filtering problem
- Fokker–Planck equation / Mar anl
- Geometric Brownian motion / Mar
- Girsanov theorem
- Green measure
- Heston model / fnc
- Hörmander's condition / anl
- Infinitesimal generator
- Itô's lemma
- Itô calculus
- Itô diffusion
- Itô isometry
- Itô's lemma
- Kolmogorov backward equation / Mar
- Local time
- Milstein method / Mar
- Novikov's condition
- Ornstein–Uhlenbeck process / Gau Mar
- Quadratic variation
- Random dynamical system / rds
- Reversible diffusion
- Runge–Kutta method
- Russo–Vallois integral
- Schramm–Loewner evolution
- Semimartingale
- Stochastic calculus
- Stochastic differential equation
- Stochastic processes and boundary value problems / anl
- Stratonovich integral
- Tanaka equation
- Tanaka's formula
- Wiener process / Gau Mar
- Wiener sausage

=== Malliavin calculus (Mal) ===
- Malliavin calculus
- Clark–Ocone theorem
- H-derivative
- Integral representation theorem for classical Wiener space
- Integration by parts operator
- Malliavin derivative
- Malliavin's absolute continuity lemma
- Ornstein–Uhlenbeck operator
- Skorokhod integral

=== Random dynamical systems (rds) ===
Random dynamical system / scl

- Absorbing set
- Base flow
- Pullback attractor

=== Analytic aspects (including measure theoretic) (anl) ===
- Probability space
- Carleman's condition / mnt (1:R)
- Characteristic function / lmt (1F:DCR)
- Contiguity#Probability theory
- Càdlàg
- Disintegration theorem / cnd (2:G)
- Dynkin system
- Exponential family
- Factorial moment generating function / mnt (1:R)
- Filtration
- Fokker–Planck equation / scl Mar
- Gaussian measure / Gau
- Hamburger moment problem / mnt (1:R)
- Hausdorff moment problem / mnt (1:R)
- Helly–Bray theorem / lmt (L:R)
- Hörmander's condition / scl
- Integration of the normal density function / spd Gau
- Kolmogorov extension theorem / (SU:R)
- Krylov–Bogolyubov theorem / Mar
- Law (stochastic processes) / (U:G)
- Location-scale family
- Lévy's continuity theorem / lmt (L:R)
- Minlos' theorem
- Moment problem / mnt (1:R)
- Moment-generating function / mnt (1F:R)
- Natural filtration / (U:G)
- Paley–Wiener integral / Gau
- Sazonov's theorem
- Slutsky's theorem / lmt
- Standard probability space
- Stieltjes moment problem / mnt (1:R)
- Stochastic matrix / Mar
- Stochastic processes and boundary value problems / scl
- Trigonometric moment problem / mnt (1:R)
- Weak convergence of measures / lmt
- Weingarten function / rmt

== Core probability: other articles, by number and type of random variables ==
=== A single random variable (1:) ===
==== Binary (1:B) ====
- Bernoulli trial / (1:B)
- Complementary event / (1:B)
- Entropy / (1:BDC)
- Event / (1:B)
- Indecomposable distribution / (1:BDCR)
- Indicator function / (1F:B)

==== Discrete (1:D) ====
- Binomial probability / (1:D)
- Continuity correction / (1:DC)
- Entropy / (1:BDC)
- Equiprobable / (1:D)
- Hann function / (1:D)
- Indecomposable distribution / (1:BDCR)
- Infinite divisibility / (1:DCR)
- Le Cam's theorem / (F:B) (1:D)
- Limiting density of discrete points / (1:DC)
- Mean difference / (1:DCR)
- Memorylessness / (1:DCR)
- Probability vector / (1:D)
- Probability-generating function / (1:D)
- Tsallis entropy / (1:DC)

==== Continuous (1:C) ====
- Almost surely / (1:C) (LS:D)
- Continuity correction / (1:DC)
- Edgeworth series / (1:C)
- Entropy / (1:BDC)
- Indecomposable distribution / (1:BDCR)
- Infinite divisibility / (1:DCR)
- Limiting density of discrete points / (1:DC)
- Location parameter / (1:C)
- Mean difference / (1:DCR)
- Memorylessness / (1:DCR)
- Monotone likelihood ratio / (1:C)
- Scale parameter / (1:C)
- Stability / (1:C)
- Stein's lemma / (12:C)
- Truncated distribution / (1:C)
- Tsallis entropy / (1:DC)

==== Real-valued, arbitrary (1:R) ====
- Heavy-tailed distribution / (1:R)
- Indecomposable distribution / (1:BDCR)
- Infinite divisibility / (1:DCR)
- Locality / (1:R)
- Mean difference / (1:DCR)
- Memorylessness / (1:DCR)
- Quantile / (1:R)
- Survival function / (1:R)
- Taylor expansions for the moments of functions of random variables / (1:R)

==== Random point of a manifold (1:M) ====
- Bertrand's paradox / (1:M)

==== General (random element of an abstract space) (1:G) ====
- Pitman–Yor process / (1:G)
- Random compact set / (1:G)
- Random element / (1:G)

=== Two random variables (2:) ===
==== Binary (2:B) ====
- Coupling / (2:BRG)
- Craps principle / (2:B)

==== Discrete (2:D) ====
- Kullback–Leibler divergence / (2:DCR)
- Mutual information / (23F:DC)

==== Continuous (2:C) ====
- Copula / (2F:C)
- Cramér's theorem / (2:C)
- Kullback–Leibler divergence / (2:DCR)
- Mutual information / (23F:DC)
- Normally distributed and uncorrelated does not imply independent / (2:C)
- Posterior probability / Bay (2:C)
- Stein's lemma / (12:C)

==== Real-valued, arbitrary (2:R) ====
- Coupling / (2:BRG)
- Hellinger distance / (2:R)
- Kullback–Leibler divergence / (2:DCR)
- Lévy metric / (2:R)
- Total variation#Total variation distance in probability theory / (2:R)

==== General (random element of an abstract space) (2:G) ====
- Coupling / (2:BRG)
- Lévy–Prokhorov metric / (2:G)
- Wasserstein metric / (2:G)

=== Three random variables (3:) ===
==== Binary (3:B) ====
- Pairwise independence / (3:B) (F:R)

==== Discrete (3:D) ====
- Mutual information / (23F:DC)

==== Continuous (3:C) ====
- Mutual information / (23F:DC)

=== Finitely many random variables (F:) ===
==== Binary (F:B) ====
- Bertrand's ballot theorem / (F:B)
- Boole's inequality / (FS:B)
- Coin flipping / (F:B)
- Collectively exhaustive events / (F:B)
- Inclusion–exclusion principle / (F:B)
- Independence / (F:BR)
- Indicator function / (1F:B)
- Law of total probability / (F:B)
- Le Cam's theorem / (F:B) (1:D)
- Leftover hash lemma / (F:B)
- Lovász local lemma / (F:B)
- Mutually exclusive / (F:B)
- Random walk / (FLS:BD) (U:C)
- Schuette–Nesbitt formula / (F:B)

==== Discrete (F:D) ====
- Coupon collector's problem / gmb (F:D)
- Graphical model / (F:D)
- Kirkwood approximation / (F:D)
- Mutual information / (23F:DC)
- Random field / (F:D)
- Random walk / (FLS:BD) (U:C)
- Stopped process / (FU:DG)

==== Continuous (F:C) ====
- Anderson's theorem#Application to probability theory / (F:C)
- Autoregressive integrated moving average / (FS:C)
- Autoregressive model / (FS:C)
- Autoregressive moving average model / (FS:C)
- Copula / (2F:C)
- Maxwell's theorem / (F:C)
- Moving average model / (FS:C)
- Mutual information / (23F:DC)
- Schrödinger method / (F:C)

==== Real-valued, arbitrary (F:R) ====
- Bapat–Beg theorem / (F:R)
- Comonotonicity / (F:R)
- Doob martingale / (F:R)
- Independence / (F:BR)
- Littlewood–Offord problem / (F:R)
- Lévy flight / (F:R) (U:C)
- Martingale / (FU:R)
- Martingale difference sequence / (F:R)
- Maximum likelihood / (FL:R)
- Multivariate random variable / (F:R)
- Optional stopping theorem / (FS:R)
- Pairwise independence / (3:B) (F:R)
- Stopping time / (FU:R)
- Time series / (FS:R)
- Wald's equation / (FS:R)
- Wick product / (F:R)

==== General (random element of an abstract space) (F:G) ====
- Finite-dimensional distribution / (FU:G)
- Hitting time / (FU:G)
- Stopped process / (FU:DG)

=== A large number of random variables (finite but tending to infinity) (L:) ===
==== Binary (L:B) ====
- Random walk / (FLS:BD) (U:C)

==== Discrete (L:D) ====
- Almost surely / (1:C) (LS:D)
- Gambler's ruin / gmb (L:D)
- Loop-erased random walk / (L:D) (U:C)
- Preferential attachment / (L:D)
- Random walk / (FLS:BD) (U:C)
- Typical set / (L:D)

==== Real-valued, arbitrary (L:R) ====
- Convergence of random variables / (LS:R)
- Law of large numbers / (LS:R)
- Maximum likelihood / (FL:R)
- Stochastic convergence / (LS:R)

=== An infinite sequence of random variables (S:) ===
==== Binary (S:B) ====
- Bernoulli process / (S:B)
- Boole's inequality / (FS:B)
- Borel–Cantelli lemma / (S:B)
- De Finetti's theorem / (S:B)
- Exchangeable random variables / (S:BR)
- Random walk / (FLS:BD) (U:C)

==== Discrete (S:D) ====
- Almost surely / (1:C) (LS:D)
- Asymptotic equipartition property / (S:DC)
- Bernoulli scheme / (S:D)
- Branching process / (S:D)
- Chinese restaurant process / (S:D)
- Galton–Watson process / (S:D)
- Information source / (S:D)
- Random walk / (FLS:BD) (U:C)

==== Continuous (S:C) ====
- Asymptotic equipartition property / (S:DC)
- Autoregressive integrated moving average / (FS:C)
- Autoregressive model / (FS:C)
- Autoregressive–moving-average model / (FS:C)
- Moving-average model / (FS:C)

==== Real-valued, arbitrary (S:R) ====
- Big O in probability notation / (S:R)
- Convergence of random variables / (LS:R)
- Doob's martingale convergence theorems / (SU:R)
- Ergodic theory / (S:R)
- Exchangeable random variables / (S:BR)
- Hewitt–Savage zero–one law / (S:RG)
- Kolmogorov's zero–one law / (S:R)
- Law of large numbers / (LS:R)
- Law of the iterated logarithm / (S:R)
- Maximal ergodic theorem / (S:R)
- Op (statistics) / (S:R)
- Optional stopping theorem / (FS:R)
- Stationary process / (SU:R)
- Stochastic convergence / (LS:R)
- Stochastic process / (SU:RG)
- Time series / (FS:R)
- Uniform integrability / (S:R)
- Wald's equation / (FS:R)

==== General (random element of an abstract space) (S:G) ====
- Hewitt–Savage zero–one law / (S:RG)
- Mixing / (S:G)
- Skorokhod's representation theorem / (S:G)
- Stochastic process / (SU:RG)

=== Uncountably many random variables (continuous-time processes etc) (U:) ===
==== Discrete (U:D) ====
- Counting process / (U:D)
- Cox process / (U:D)
- Dirichlet process / (U:D)
- Lévy process / (U:DC)
- Non-homogeneous Poisson process / (U:D)
- Point process / (U:D)
- Poisson process / (U:D)
- Poisson random measure / (U:D)
- Random measure / (U:D)
- Renewal theory / (U:D)
- Stopped process / (FU:DG)

==== Continuous (U:C) ====
- Brownian motion / phs (U:C)
- Gamma process / (U:C)
- Loop-erased random walk / (L:D) (U:C)
- Lévy flight / (F:R) (U:C)
- Lévy process / (U:DC)
- Martingale representation theorem / (U:C)
- Random walk / (FLS:BD) (U:C)
- Skorokhod's embedding theorem / (U:C)

==== Real-valued, arbitrary (U:R) ====
- Compound Poisson process / (U:R)
- Continuous stochastic process / (U:RG)
- Doob's martingale convergence theorems / (SU:R)
- Doob–Meyer decomposition theorem / (U:R)
- Feller-continuous process / (U:R)
- Kolmogorov continuity theorem / (U:R)
- Local martingale / (U:R)
- Martingale / (FU:R)
- Stationary process / (SU:R)
- Stochastic process / (SU:RG)
- Stopping time / (FU:R)

==== General (random element of an abstract space) (U:G) ====
- Adapted process / (U:G)
- Continuous stochastic process / (U:RG)
- Finite-dimensional distribution / (FU:G)
- Hitting time / (FU:G)
- Killed process / (U:G)
- Progressively measurable process / (U:G)
- Sample-continuous process / (U:G)
- Stochastic process / (SU:RG)
- Stopped process / (FU:DG)

== Around the core ==
=== General aspects (grl) ===
- Average
- Bean machine
- Cox's theorem
- Equipossible
- Exotic probability
- Extractor
- Free probability
- Frequency
- Frequency probability
- Impossible event
- Infinite monkey theorem
- Information geometry
- Law of Truly Large Numbers
- Littlewood's law
- Observational error
- Principle of indifference
- Principle of maximum entropy
- Probability
- Probability interpretations
- Propensity probability
- Random number generator
- Random sequence
- Randomization
- Randomness
- Statistical dispersion
- Statistical regularity
- Uncertainty
- Upper and lower probabilities
- Urn problem

=== Foundations of probability theory (fnd) ===
- Algebra of random variables
- Belief propagation
- Dempster–Shafer theory
- Dutch book
- Elementary event
- Normalizing constant
- Possibility theory
- Probability axioms
- Transferable belief model
- Unit measure

=== Gambling (gmb) ===
- Betting
- Bookmaker
- Coherence
- Coupon collector's problem / (F:D)
- Coupon collector's problem (generating function approach) / (F:D)
- Gambler's fallacy
- Gambler's ruin / (L:D)
- Game of chance
- Inverse gambler's fallacy
- Lottery
- Lottery machine
- Luck
- Martingale
- Odds
- Pachinko
- Parimutuel betting
- Parrondo's paradox
- Pascal's wager
- Poker probability
- Poker probability (Omaha)
- Poker probability (Texas hold 'em)
- Pot odds
- Proebsting's paradox
- Roulette
- Spread betting
- The man who broke the bank at Monte Carlo

=== Coincidence (cnc) ===
- Bible code
- Birthday paradox
- Birthday problem
- Index of coincidence
- Spurious relationship

=== Algorithmics (alg) ===
- Algorithmic Lovász local lemma
- Box–Muller transform
- Gibbs sampling
- Inverse transform sampling method
- Las Vegas algorithm
- Metropolis algorithm
- Monte Carlo method
- Panjer recursion
- Probabilistic Turing machine
- Probabilistic algorithm
- Probabilistically checkable proof
- Probable prime
- Stochastic programming

=== Bayesian approach (Bay) ===
- Bayes factor
- Bayesian model comparison
- Bayesian network / Mar
- Bayesian probability
- Bayesian programming
- Bayesianism
- Checking if a coin is fair
- Conjugate prior
- Factor graph
- Good–Turing frequency estimation
- Imprecise probability
- Inverse probability / cnd
- Marginal likelihood
- Markov blanket / Mar
- Posterior probability / (2:C)
- Prior probability
- SIPTA
- Subjective logic
- Subjectivism#Subjectivism in probability / hst

=== Financial mathematics (fnc) ===
- Allais paradox
- Black–Scholes
- Cox–Ingersoll–Ross model
- Forward measure
- Heston model / scl
- Jump process
- Jump-diffusion model
- Kelly criterion
- Market risk
- Mathematics of bookmaking
- Risk
- Risk-neutral measure
- Ruin theory
- Sethi model
- Technical analysis
- Value at risk
- Variance gamma process / spr
- Vasicek model
- Volatility

=== Physics (phs) ===
- Boltzmann factor
- Brownian motion / (U:C)
- Brownian ratchet
- Cosmic variance
- Critical phenomena
- Diffusion-limited aggregation
- Fluctuation theorem
- Gibbs state
- Information entropy
- Lattice model
- Master equation / Mar (U:D)
- Negative probability
- Nonextensive entropy
- Partition function
- Percolation theory / rgr (L:B)
- Percolation threshold / rgr
- Probability amplitude
- Quantum Markov chain / Mar
- Quantum probability
- Scaling limit
- Statistical mechanics
- Statistical physics
- Vacuum expectation value

=== Genetics (gnt) ===
- Ewens's sampling formula
- Hardy–Weinberg principle
- Population genetics
- Punnett square
- Ronald Fisher

=== Stochastic process (spr) ===
- Anomaly time series
- Arrival theorem
- Beverton–Holt model
- Burke's theorem
- Buzen's algorithm
- Disorder problem
- Erlang unit
- G-network
- Gordon–Newell theorem
- Innovation
- Interacting particle system
- Jump diffusion
- M/M/1 model
- M/M/c model
- Mark V Shaney
- Markov chain Monte Carlo
- Markov switching multifractal
- Oscillator linewidth
- Poisson hidden Markov model
- Population process
- Probabilistic cellular automata
- Product-form solution / Mar
- Quasireversibility
- Queueing theory
- Recurrence period density entropy
- Variance gamma process / fnc
- Wiener equation

=== Geometric probability (geo) ===
- Boolean model
- Buffon's needle
- Geometric probability
- Hadwiger's theorem
- Integral geometry
- Random coil
- Stochastic geometry
- Vitale's random Brunn–Minkowski inequality

=== Empirical findings (emp) ===
- Benford's law
- Pareto principle

=== Historical (hst) ===
- History of probability
- Newton–Pepys problem
- Problem of points
- Subjectivism#Subjectivism in probability / Bay
- Sunrise problem
- The Doctrine of Chances

=== Miscellany (msc) ===
- B-convex space
- Conditional event algebra
- Error function
- Goodman–Nguyen–van Fraassen algebra
- List of mathematical probabilists
- Nuisance variable
- Probabilistic encryption
- Probabilistic logic
- Probabilistic proofs of non-probabilistic theorems
- Pseudocount

== Counters of articles ==
- "Core": 455 (570)
- "Around": 198 (200)
- "Core selected": 311 (358)
- "Core others": 144 (212)

Here k(n) means: n links to k articles. (Some articles are linked more than once.)
