= List of stochastic processes topics =

In the mathematics of probability, a stochastic process is a random function. In practical applications, the domain over which the function is defined is a time interval (time series) or a region of space (random field).

Familiar examples of time series include stock market and exchange rate fluctuations, signals such as speech, audio and video; medical data such as a patient's EKG, EEG, blood pressure or temperature; and random movement such as Brownian motion or random walks.

Examples of random fields include static images, random topographies (landscapes), or composition variations of an inhomogeneous material.

== Stochastic processes topics ==
This list is currently incomplete. See also Category:Stochastic processes

- Basic affine jump diffusion
- Bernoulli process: discrete-time processes with two possible states.
  - Bernoulli schemes: discrete-time processes with N possible states; every stationary process in N outcomes is a Bernoulli scheme, and vice versa.
- Bessel process
- Birth–death process
- Branching process
- Branching random walk
- Brownian bridge
- Brownian motion
- Chinese restaurant process
- CIR process
- Continuous stochastic process
- Cox process
- Dirichlet processes
- Finite-dimensional distribution
- First passage time
- Galton–Watson process
- Gamma process
- Gaussian process – a process where all linear combinations of coordinates are normally distributed random variables.
  - Gauss–Markov process (cf. below)
- GenI process
- Girsanov's theorem
- Hawkes process
- Homogeneous processes: processes where the domain has some symmetry and the finite-dimensional probability distributions also have that symmetry. Special cases include stationary processes, also called time-homogeneous.
- Karhunen–Loève theorem
- Lévy process
- Local time (mathematics)
- Loop-erased random walk
- Markov processes are those in which the future is conditionally independent of the past given the present.
  - Markov chain
  - Markov chain central limit theorem
  - Continuous-time Markov process
  - Markov process
  - Semi-Markov process
  - Gauss–Markov processes: processes that are both Gaussian and Markov
- Martingales – processes with constraints on the expectation
- Onsager–Machlup function
- Ornstein–Uhlenbeck process
- Percolation theory
- Point processes: random arrangements of points in a space $S$. They can be modelled as stochastic processes where the domain is a sufficiently large family of subsets of S, ordered by inclusion; the range is the set of natural numbers; and, if A is a subset of B, ƒ(A) ≤ ƒ(B) with probability 1.
- Poisson process
  - Compound Poisson process
- Population process
- Probabilistic cellular automaton
- Queueing theory
  - Queue
- Random field
  - Gaussian random field
  - Markov random field
- Sample-continuous process
- Stationary process
- Stochastic calculus
  - Itô calculus
  - Malliavin calculus
  - Semimartingale
  - Stratonovich integral
- Stochastic control
- Stochastic differential equation
- Stochastic process
- Telegraph process
- Time series
- Wald's martingale
- Wiener process
