= Continuous-time stochastic process =

In probability theory and statistics, a continuous-time stochastic process, or a continuous-space-time stochastic process is a stochastic process for which the index variable takes a continuous set of values, as contrasted with a discrete-time process for which the index variable takes only distinct values. An alternative terminology uses continuous parameter as being more inclusive.

A more restricted class of processes are the continuous stochastic processes; here the term often (but not always) implies both that the index variable is continuous and that sample paths of the process are continuous. Given the possible confusion, caution is needed.

Continuous-time stochastic processes that are constructed from discrete-time processes via a waiting time distribution are called continuous-time random walks.

== Examples ==
An example of a continuous-time stochastic process for which sample paths are not continuous is a Poisson process. An example with continuous paths is the Ornstein–Uhlenbeck process.

== See also ==
- Continuous signal
