= Large deviations of Gaussian random functions =

A random function – of either one variable (a random process), or two or more variables (a random field) – is called Gaussian if every finite-dimensional distribution is a multivariate normal distribution. Gaussian random fields on the sphere are useful (for example) when analysing

- the anomalies in the cosmic microwave background radiation (see, pp. 8–9);
- brain images obtained by positron emission tomography (see, pp. 9–10).

Sometimes, a value of a Gaussian random function deviates from its expected value by several standard deviations. This is a large deviation. Though rare in a small domain (of space or/and time), large deviations may be quite usual in a large domain.

== Basic statement ==
Let $M$ be the maximal value of a Gaussian random function $X$ on the (two-dimensional) sphere. Assume that the expected value of $X$ is $0$ (at every point of the sphere), and the standard deviation of $X$ is $1$ (at every point of the sphere). Then, for large $a>0$, $P(M>a)$ is close to $C a \exp(-a^2/2) + 2P(\xi>a)$, where $\xi$ is distributed $N(0,1)$ (the standard normal distribution), and $C$ is a constant; it does not depend on $a$, but depends on the correlation function of $X$ (see below). The relative error of the approximation decays exponentially for large $a$.

The constant $C$ is easy to determine in the important special case described in terms of the directional derivative of $X$ at a given point (of the sphere) in a given direction (tangential to the sphere). The derivative is random, with zero expectation and some standard deviation. The latter may depend on the point and the direction. However, if it does not depend, then it is equal to $(\pi/2)^{1/4} C^{1/2}$ (for the sphere of radius $1$).

The coefficient $2$ before $P(\xi>a)$ is in fact the Euler characteristic of the sphere (for the torus it vanishes).

It is assumed that $X$ is twice continuously differentiable (almost surely), and reaches its maximum at a single point (almost surely).

== The clue: mean Euler characteristic ==
The clue to the theory sketched above is, Euler characteristic $\chi_a$ of the set $\{X>a\}$ of all points $t$ (of the sphere) such that $X(t)>a$. Its expected value (in other words, mean value) $E(\chi_a)$ can be calculated explicitly:

$$E(\chi_a) = C a \exp(-a^2/2) + 2 P(\xi>a)$$

(which is far from being trivial, and involves Poincaré–Hopf theorem, Gauss–Bonnet theorem, Rice's formula etc.).

The set $\{X>a\}$ is the empty set whenever $M<a$; in this case $\chi_a=0$. In the other case, when $M>a$, the set $\{X>a\}$ is non-empty; its Euler characteristic may take various values, depending on the topology of the set (the number of connected components, and possible holes in these components). However, if $a$ is large and $M>a$ then the set $\{X>a\}$ is usually a small, slightly deformed disk or ellipse (which is easy to guess, but quite difficult to prove). Thus, its Euler characteristic $\chi_a$ is usually equal to $1$ (given that $M>a$). This is why $E(\chi_a)$ is close to $P(M>a)$.

== See also ==
- Gaussian process
- Gaussian random field
- Large deviations theory
