= Additive Markov chain =

In probability theory, an additive Markov chain is a Markov chain with an additive conditional probability function. Here the process is a discrete-time Markov chain of order m and the transition probability to a state at the next time is a sum of functions, each depending on the next state and one of the m previous states.

== Definition ==
An additive Markov chain of order m is a sequence of random variables X_{1}, X_{2}, X_{3}, ..., possessing the following property: the probability that a random variable X_{n} has a certain value x_{n} under the condition that the values of all previous variables are fixed depends on the values of m previous variables only (Markov chain of order m), and the influence of previous variables on a generated one is additive,

$$\Pr(X_n=x_n\mid X_{n-1}=x_{n-1}, X_{n-2}=x_{n-2}, \dots, X_{n-m}=x_{n-m}) = \sum_{r=1}^{m} f(x_n,x_{n-r},r).$$

== Binary case ==
A binary additive Markov chain is where the state space of the chain consists on two values only, X_{n} ∈ { x_{1}, x_{2} }. For example, X_{n} ∈ { 0, 1 }. The conditional probability function of a binary additive Markov chain can be represented as

$$\Pr(X_n=1\mid X_{n-1}=x_{n-1}, X_{n-2}=x_{n-2}, \dots) = \bar{X} + \sum_{r=1}^{m} F(r) (x_{n-r}-\bar{X}),$$

$$\Pr(X_n=0\mid X_{n-1}=x_{n-1}, X_{n-2}=x_{n-2}, \dots) = 1 - \Pr(X_n=1\mid X_{n-1} = x_{n-1}, X_{n-2} = x_{n-2}, \dots).$$

Here $\bar{X}$ is the probability to find X_{n} = 1 in the sequence and F(r) is referred to as the memory function. The value of $\bar{X}$ and the function F(r) contain all the information about correlation properties of the Markov chain.

=== Relation between the memory function and the correlation function ===
In the binary case, the correlation function between the variables $X_n$ and $X_k$ of the chain depends on the distance $n - k$ only. It is defined as follows:

$$K(r) = \langle (X_n-\bar{X})(X_{n+r}-\bar{X}) \rangle = \langle X_n X_{n+r} \rangle -{\bar{X}}^2,$$

where the symbol $\langle \cdots \rangle$ denotes averaging over all n. By definition,

$$K(-r)=K(r),   K(0)=\bar{X}(1-\bar{X}).$$

There is a relation between the memory function and the correlation function of the binary additive Markov chain:

$$K(r)=\sum_{s=1}^m K(r-s)F(s), \, \, \, \, r=1, 2, \dots\,.$$

== See also ==
- Examples of Markov chains
