= Onsager–Machlup function =

Summary of dynamics of a stochastic process

The Onsager–Machlup function is a function that summarizes the dynamics of a continuous stochastic process. It is used to define a probability density for a stochastic process, and it is similar to the Lagrangian of a dynamical system. It is named after Lars Onsager and Stefan Machlup who were the first to consider such probability densities.

The dynamics of a continuous stochastic process X from time t = 0 to t = T in one dimension, satisfying a stochastic differential equation

$$dX_t = b(X_t)\,dt + \sigma(X_t)\,dW_t$$

where W is a Wiener process, can in approximation be described by the probability density function of its value x_{i} at a finite number of points in time t_{i}:

$$p(x_1,\ldots,x_n) = \left( \prod^{n-1}_{i=1} \frac{1}{\sqrt{2\pi\sigma(x_i)^2\Delta t_i}} \right) \exp\left(-\sum^{n-1}_{i=1} L\left(x_i,\frac{x_{i+1}-x_i}{\Delta t_i}\right) \, \Delta t_i \right)$$

where

$$L(x,v) = \frac{1}{2}\left(\frac{v - b(x)}{\sigma(x)}\right)^2$$

and Δt_{i} = t_{i+1} − t_{i} > 0, t_{1} = 0 and t_{n} = T. A similar approximation is possible for processes in higher dimensions. The approximation is more accurate for smaller time step sizes Δt_{i}, but in the limit Δt_{i} → 0 the probability density function becomes ill-defined, one reason being that the product of terms

$$\frac{1}{\sqrt{2\pi\sigma(x_i)^2\Delta t_i}}$$

diverges to infinity. In order to nevertheless define a density for the continuous stochastic process X, ratios of probabilities of X lying within a small distance ε from smooth curves φ_{1} and φ_{2} are considered:

$$\frac{P\left( \left |X_t - \varphi_1(t) \right| \leq \varepsilon \text{ for every }t\in[0,T] \right)}{P\left( \left |X_t - \varphi_2(t) \right | \leq \varepsilon \text{ for every }t\in[0,T] \right)} \to \exp\left(-\int^T_0 L \left (\varphi_1(t),\dot{\varphi}_1(t) \right ) \, dt + \int^T_0 L \left (\varphi_2(t),\dot{\varphi}_2(t) \right) \, dt \right)$$

as ε → 0, where L is the Onsager–Machlup function.

== Definition ==
Consider a d-dimensional Riemannian manifold M and a diffusion process X = {X_{t} : 0 ≤ t ≤ T} on M with infinitesimal generator 1/2Δ_{M} + b, where Δ_{M} is the Laplace–Beltrami operator and b is a vector field. For any two smooth curves φ_{1}, φ_{2} : [0, T] → M,

$$\lim_{\varepsilon\downarrow0} \frac{P\left( \rho(X_t,\varphi_1(t)) \leq \varepsilon \text{ for every }t\in[0,T] \right)}{P\left( \rho(X_t,\varphi_2(t)) \leq \varepsilon \text{ for every }t\in[0,T] \right)} = \exp\left( -\int^T_0 L \left (\varphi_1(t),\dot{\varphi}_1(t) \right ) \, dt  +\int^T_0 L \left (\varphi_2(t),\dot{\varphi}_2(t) \right ) \, dt  \right)$$

where ρ is the Riemannian distance, $\scriptstyle \dot{\varphi}_1, \dot{\varphi}_2$ denote the first derivatives of φ_{1}, φ_{2}, and L is called the Onsager–Machlup function.

The Onsager–Machlup function is given by

$$L(x,v) = \tfrac{1}{2}\|v-b(x)\|_x^2 +\tfrac{1}{2}\operatorname{div}\, b(x) - \tfrac{1}{12}R(x),$$

where || ⋅ ||_{x} is the Riemannian norm in the tangent space T_{x}(M) at x, div b(x) is the divergence of b at x, and R(x) is the scalar curvature at x.

== Examples ==
The following examples give explicit expressions for the Onsager–Machlup function of a continuous stochastic processes.

=== Wiener process on the real line ===
The Onsager–Machlup function of a Wiener process on the real line R is given by

$$L(x,v)=\tfrac{1}{2}|v|^2.$$

Proof: Let X = {X_{t} : 0 ≤ t ≤ T} be a Wiener process on R and let φ : [0, T] → R be a twice differentiable curve such that φ(0) = X_{0}. Define another process X^{φ} = {X_{t}^{φ} : 0 ≤ t ≤ T} by X_{t}^{φ} = X_{t} − φ(t) and a measure P^{φ} by

$$P^\varphi = \exp\left( \int^T_0\dot{\varphi}(t) \, dX^\varphi_t + \int^T_0\tfrac{1}{2} \left |\dot{\varphi}(t) \right |^2 \, dt \right) \, dP.$$

For every ε > 0, the probability that |X_{t} − φ(t)| ≤ ε for every t ∈ [0, T] satisfies

$$\begin{align}
P \left ( \left |X_t-\varphi(t) \right |\leq\varepsilon \text{ for every }t\in[0,T] \right ) &=P\left ( \left |X^\varphi_t \right|\leq\varepsilon \text{ for every }t\in[0,T] \right) \\
&=\int_{\left \{ \left |X^\varphi_t \right |\leq\varepsilon\text{ for every }t\in[0,T] \right\}} \exp\left( -\int^T_0\dot{\varphi}(t) \, dX^\varphi_t -\int^T_0\tfrac{1}{2}|\dot{\varphi}(t)|^2 \, dt \right) \, dP^\varphi.
\end{align}$$

By Girsanov's theorem, the distribution of X^{φ} under P^{φ} equals the distribution of X under P, hence the latter can be substituted by the former:

$$P(|X_t-\varphi(t)|\leq\varepsilon \text{ for every }t\in[0,T])=\int_{\left \{ \left |X^\varphi_t \right |\leq\varepsilon\text{ for every }t\in[0,T] \right\}} \exp\left( -\int^T_0\dot{\varphi}(t) \, dX_t -\int^T_0\tfrac{1}{2}|\dot{\varphi}(t)|^2 \, dt \right) \, dP.$$

By Itō's lemma it holds that

$$\int^T_0\dot{\varphi}(t) \, dX_t = \dot{\varphi}(T)X_T - \int^T_0\ddot{\varphi}(t)X_t \, dt,$$

where $\scriptstyle \ddot{\varphi}$ is the second derivative of φ, and so this term is of order ε on the event where |X_{t}| ≤ ε for every t ∈ [0, T] and will disappear in the limit ε → 0, hence

$$\lim_{\varepsilon\downarrow 0} \frac{P(|X_t-\varphi(t)|\leq\varepsilon \text{ for every }t\in[0,T])}{P(|X_t|\leq\varepsilon\text{ for every } t \in [0,T])} =\exp\left( -\int^T_0\tfrac{1}{2}|\dot{\varphi}(t)|^2 \, dt \right).$$

=== Diffusion processes with constant diffusion coefficient on Euclidean space ===
The Onsager–Machlup function in the one-dimensional case with constant diffusion coefficient σ is given by

$$L(x,v)=\frac{1}{2}\left|\frac{v-b(x)}{\sigma}\right|^2 + \frac{1}{2}\frac{db}{dx}(x).$$

In the d-dimensional case, with σ equal to the unit matrix, it is given by

$$L(x,v)=\frac{1}{2}\|v-b(x)\|^2 + \frac{1}{2}(\operatorname{div}\, b)(x),$$

where || ⋅ || is the Euclidean norm and

$$(\operatorname{div}\, b)(x) = \sum_{i=1}^d \frac{\partial}{\partial x_i} b_i(x).$$

== Generalizations ==
Generalizations have been obtained by weakening the differentiability condition on the curve φ. Rather than taking the maximum distance between the stochastic process and the curve over a time interval, other conditions have been considered such as distances based on completely convex norms and Hölder, Besov and Sobolev type norms.

== Applications ==
The Onsager–Machlup function can be used for purposes of reweighting and sampling trajectories, as well as for determining the most probable trajectory of a diffusion process.

== See also ==
- Lagrangian
- Functional integration

== Bibliography ==
- Adib, A.B. (2008). "Stochastic actions for diffusive dynamics: Reweighting, sampling, and minimization". J. Phys. Chem. B. 112 (19): 5910–5916. arXiv:0712.1255. Bibcode:2008JPCB..112.5910A. doi:10.1021/jp0751458. PMID 17999482. S2CID 16366252.
- Capitaine, M. (1995). "Onsager–Machlup functional for some smooth norms on Wiener space". Probab. Theory Relat. Fields. 102 (2): 189–201. doi:10.1007/bf01213388. S2CID 120675014.
- Dürr, D. & Bach, A. (1978). "The Onsager–Machlup function as Lagrangian for the most probable path of a diffusion process". Commun. Math. Phys. 60 (2): 153–170. Bibcode:1978CMaPh..60..153D. doi:10.1007/bf01609446. S2CID 41249746.
- Fujita, T. & Kotani, S. (1982). "The Onsager–Machlup function for diffusion processes". J. Math. Kyoto Univ. 22: 115–130. doi:10.1215/kjm/1250521863.
- Ikeda, N. & Watanabe, S. (1980). Stochastic differential equations and diffusion processes. Kodansha-John Wiley.
- Onsager, L. & Machlup, S. (1953). "Fluctuations and Irreversible Processes". Physical Review. 91 (6): 1505–1512. Bibcode:1953PhRv...91.1505O. doi:10.1103/physrev.91.1505.
- Shepp, L. & Zeitouni, O. (1993). "Exponential estimates for convex norms and some applications". Barcelona Seminar on Stochastic Analysis. Vol. 32. Berlin: Birkhauser-Verlag. pp. 203–215. doi:10.1007/978-3-0348-8555-3_11. ISBN 978-3-0348-9677-1.
- Stratonovich, R. (1971). "On the probability functional of diffusion processes". Select. Transl. In Math. Stat. Prob. 10: 273–286.
- Takahashi, Y.; Watanabe, S. (1981). "The probability functionals (Onsager–Machlup functions) of diffusion processes". Stochastic integrals (Proc. Sympos., Univ. Durham, Durham, 1980). Lecture Notes in Mathematics. Vol. 851. Berlin: Springer. pp. 433–463. doi:10.1007/BFb0088735. ISBN 978-3-540-10690-6. MR 0620998.
- Wittich, Olaf. "The Onsager–Machlup Functional Revisited".
- Zeitouni, O. (1989). "On the Onsager–Machlup functional of diffusion processes around non C^{2} curves". Annals of Probability. 17 (3): 1037–1054. doi:10.1214/aop/1176991255.
