= Kolmogorov continuity theorem =

Mathematical theorem

In mathematics, the Kolmogorov continuity theorem is a theorem that guarantees that a stochastic process that satisfies certain constraints on the moments of its increments will be continuous (or, more precisely, have a "continuous version"). It is credited to the Soviet mathematician Andrey Nikolaevich Kolmogorov.

== Statement ==
Let $(S,d)$ be some complete separable metric space, and let $X\colon [0, + \infty) \times \Omega \to S$ be a stochastic process. Suppose that for all times $T > 0$, there exist positive constants $\alpha, \beta, K$ such that

$$\mathbb{E} [d(X_t, X_s)^\alpha] \leq K | t - s |^{1 + \beta}$$

for all $0 \leq s, t \leq T$. Then there exists a modification $\tilde{X}$ of $X$ that is a continuous process, i.e. a process $\tilde{X}\colon [0, + \infty) \times \Omega \to S$ such that

- $\tilde{X}$ is sample-continuous;
- for every time $t \geq 0$, $\mathbb{P} (X_t = \tilde{X}_t) = 1.$

Furthermore, the paths of $\tilde{X}$ are locally $\gamma$-Hölder-continuous for every $0<\gamma<\tfrac\beta\alpha$.

== Example ==
In the case of Brownian motion on $\mathbb{R}^n$, the choice of constants $\alpha = 4$, $\beta = 1$, $K = n (n + 2)$ will work in the Kolmogorov continuity theorem. Moreover, for any positive integer $m$, the constants $\alpha = 2m$, $\beta = m-1$ will work, for some positive value of $K$ that depends on $n$ and $m$.

== See also ==
- Kolmogorov extension theorem
