= Dudley's theorem =

Concept in probability theory

In probability theory, Dudley's theorem is a result relating the expected upper bound and regularity properties of a Gaussian process to its entropy and covariance structure.

== History ==
The result was first stated and proved by V. N. Sudakov, as pointed out in a paper by Richard M. Dudley. Dudley had earlier credited Volker Strassen with making the connection between entropy and regularity.

== Statement ==
Let (X_{t})_{t∈T} be a Gaussian process centered (with mean zero) and let d_{X} be the pseudometric on T defined by

$$d_{X}(s, t) = \sqrt{\mathbf{E} \big[ | X_{s} - X_{t} |^{2} ]}. \,$$

For ε > 0, denote by N(T, d_{X}; ε) the entropy number, i.e. the minimal number of (open) d_{X}-balls of radius ε required to cover T. Then

$$\mathbf{E} \left[ \sup_{t \in T} X_{t} \right] \leq 24 \int_0^{+\infty} \sqrt{\log N(T, d_{X}; \varepsilon)} \, \mathrm{d} \varepsilon.$$

Furthermore, if the entropy integral on the right-hand side converges, then X has a version with almost all sample path bounded and (uniformly) continuous on (T, d_{X}).
