= Russo–Vallois integral =

In mathematical analysis, the Russo–Vallois integral is an extension to stochastic processes of the classical Riemann–Stieltjes integral

$$\int f \, dg=\int fg' \, ds$$

for suitable functions $f$ and $g$. The idea is to replace the derivative $g'$ by the difference quotient

$g(s+\varepsilon)-g(s)\over\varepsilon$ and to pull the limit out of the integral. In addition one changes the type of convergence.

== Definitions ==
Definition: A sequence $H_n$ of stochastic processes converges uniformly on compact sets in probability to a process $H,$

$$H=\text{ucp-}\lim_{n\rightarrow\infty}H_n,$$

if, for every $\varepsilon>0$ and $T>0,$

$$\lim_{n\rightarrow\infty}\mathbb{P}(\sup_{0\leq t\leq T}|H_n(t)-H(t)|>\varepsilon)=0.$$

One sets:

$$I^-(\varepsilon,t,f,dg)={1\over\varepsilon}\int_0^tf(s)(g(s+\varepsilon)-g(s))\,ds$$
$$I^+(\varepsilon,t,f,dg)={1\over\varepsilon}\int_0^t f(s)(g(s)-g(s-\varepsilon)) \, ds$$

and

$$[f,g]_\varepsilon (t)={1\over \varepsilon}\int_0^t(f(s+\varepsilon)-f(s))(g(s+\varepsilon)-g(s))\,ds.$$

Definition: The forward integral is defined as the ucp-limit of

$I^-$: $\int_0^t fd^-g=\text{ucp-}\lim_{\varepsilon\rightarrow\infty (0?)}I^-(\varepsilon,t,f,dg).$

Definition: The backward integral is defined as the ucp-limit of

$I^+$: $\int_0^t f \, d^+g = \text{ucp-}\lim_{\varepsilon\rightarrow\infty (0?)}I^+(\varepsilon,t,f,dg).$

Definition: The generalized bracket is defined as the ucp-limit of

$[f,g]_\varepsilon$: $[f,g]_\varepsilon=\text{ucp-}\lim_{\varepsilon\rightarrow\infty}[f,g]_\varepsilon (t).$

For continuous semimartingales $X,Y$ and a càdlàg function H, the Russo–Vallois integral coincidences with the usual Itô integral:

$$\int_0^t H_s \, dX_s=\int_0^t H \, d^-X.$$

In this case the generalised bracket is equal to the classical covariation. In the special case, this means that the process

$$[X]:=[X,X] \,$$

is equal to the quadratic variation process.

Also for the Russo-Vallois Integral an Ito formula holds: If $X$ is a continuous semimartingale and

$$f\in C_2(\mathbb{R}),$$

then

$$f(X_t)=f(X_0)+\int_0^t f'(X_s) \, dX_s + {1\over 2}\int_0^t f''(X_s) \, d[X]_s.$$

By a duality result of Triebel one can provide optimal classes of Besov spaces, where the Russo–Vallois integral can be defined. The norm in the Besov space

$$B_{p,q}^\lambda(\mathbb{R}^N)$$

is given by

$$||f||_{p,q}^\lambda=||f||_{L_p} + \left(\int_0^\infty {1\over |h|^{1+\lambda q}}(||f(x+h)-f(x)||_{L_p})^q \, dh\right)^{1/q}$$

with the well known modification for $q=\infty$. Then the following theorem holds:

Theorem: Suppose

$$f\in B_{p,q}^\lambda,$$
$$g\in B_{p',q'}^{1-\lambda},$$
$$1/p+1/p'=1\text{ and }1/q+1/q'=1.$$

Then the Russo–Vallois integral

$$\int f \, dg$$

exists and for some constant $c$ one has

$$\left| \int f \, dg \right| \leq c ||f||_{p,q}^\alpha ||g||_{p',q'}^{1-\alpha}.$$

Notice that in this case the Russo–Vallois integral coincides with the Riemann–Stieltjes integral and with the Young integral for functions with finite p-variation.
