= Killed process =

Stochastic process that is forced to assume an undefined or "killed" state at some time

In probability theory — specifically, in stochastic analysis — a killed process is a stochastic process that is forced to assume an undefined or "killed" state at some (possibly random) time.

== Definition ==
Let X : T × Ω → S be a stochastic process defined for "times" t in some ordered index set T, on a probability space (Ω, Σ, P), and taking values in a measurable space S. Let ζ : Ω → T be a random time, referred to as the killing time. Then the killed process Y associated to X is defined by

$$Y_{t} = X_{t} \mbox{ for } t < \zeta,$$

and Y_{t} is left undefined for t ≥ ζ. Alternatively, one may set Y_{t} = c for t ≥ ζ, where c is a "coffin state" not in S.

== See also ==
- Stopped process
