= Markov chains on a measurable state space =

A Markov chain on a measurable state space is a discrete-time-homogeneous Markov chain with a measurable space as state space.

== History ==
The definition of Markov chains has evolved during the 20th century. In 1953 the term Markov chain was used for stochastic processes with discrete or continuous index set, living on a countable or finite state space, see Doob. or Chung. Since the late 20th century it became more popular to consider a Markov chain as a stochastic process with discrete index set, living on a measurable state space.

== Definition ==
Denote with $(E , \Sigma)$ a measurable space and with $p$ a Markov kernel with source and target $(E , \Sigma)$. A stochastic process $(X_n)_{n \in \mathbb{N}}$ on $(\Omega,\mathcal{F},\mathbb{P})$ is called a time homogeneous Markov chain with Markov kernel $p$ and start distribution $\mu$ if

$$\mathbb{P}[X_0 \in A_0 , X_1 \in A_1, \dots , X_n \in A_n] = \int_{A_0} \dots \int_{A_{n-1}} p(y_{n-1},A_n) \, p(y_{n-2},dy_{n-1}) \dots p(y_0,dy_1) \, \mu(dy_0)$$

is satisfied for any $n \in \mathbb{N}, \, A_0,\dots,A_n \in \Sigma$. One can construct for any Markov kernel and any probability measure an associated Markov chain.

=== Remark about Markov kernel integration ===
For any measure $\mu \colon \Sigma \to [0,\infty]$ we denote for $\mu$-integrable function $f \colon E \to \mathbb{R}\cup\{ \infty, - \infty \}$ the Lebesgue integral as $\int_E f(x) \, \mu(dx)$. For the measure $\nu_x \colon \Sigma \to [0,\infty]$ defined by $\nu_x(A):= p(x,A)$ we used the following notation:

$$\int_E f(y) \, p(x,dy) :=\int_E f(y) \, \nu_x (dy).$$

== Basic properties ==
=== Starting in a single point ===
If $\mu$ is a Dirac measure in $x$, we denote for a Markov kernel $p$ with starting distribution $\mu$ the associated Markov chain as $(X_n)_{n \in \mathbb{N}}$ on $(\Omega,\mathcal{F},\mathbb{P}_x)$ and the expectation value

$$\mathbb{E}_x[X] = \int_\Omega X(\omega) \, \mathbb{P}_x(d\omega)$$

for a $\mathbb{P}_x$-integrable function $X$. By definition, we have then $\mathbb{P}_x[X_0 = x] = 1$.

We have for any measurable function $f \colon E \to [0,\infty]$ the following relation:

$$\int_E f(y) \, p(x,dy) = \mathbb{E}_x[f(X_1)].$$

=== Family of Markov kernels ===
For a Markov kernel $p$ with starting distribution $\mu$ one can introduce a family of Markov kernels $(p_n)_{n\in\mathbb{N}}$ by

$$p_{n+1}(x,A) := \int_E p_n(y,A) \, p(x,dy)$$

for $n \in \mathbb{N}, \, n \geq 1$ and $p_1 := p$. For the associated Markov chain $(X_n)_{n \in \mathbb{N}}$ according to $p$ and $\mu$ one obtains

$$\mathbb{P}[X_0 \in A , \, X_n \in B ] = \int_A p_n(x,B) \, \mu(dx)$$.

=== Stationary measure ===
A probability measure $\mu$ is called stationary measure of a Markov kernel $p$ if

$$\int_A \mu(dx) = \int_E p(x,A) \, \mu(dx)$$

holds for any $A \in \Sigma$. If $(X_n)_{n \in \mathbb{N}}$ on $(\Omega,\mathcal{F},\mathbb{P})$ denotes the Markov chain according to a Markov kernel $p$ with stationary measure $\mu$, and the distribution of $X_0$ is $\mu$, then all $X_n$ have the same probability distribution, namely:

$$\mathbb{P}[X_n \in A ] = \mu(A)$$

for any $A \in \Sigma$.

=== Reversibility ===
A Markov kernel $p$ is called reversible according to a probability measure $\mu$ if

$$\int_A p(x,B) \, \mu(dx) = \int_B p(x,A) \, \mu(dx)$$

holds for any $A,B \in \Sigma$. Replacing $A=E$ shows that if $p$ is reversible according to $\mu$, then $\mu$ must be a stationary measure of $p$.

== See also ==
- Harris chain
- Subshift of finite type
