= Newton–Pepys problem =

Probability problem

The Newton–Pepys problem is a probability problem concerning the probability of throwing sixes from a certain number of dice.

In 1693 Samuel Pepys and Isaac Newton corresponded over a problem posed to Pepys by a school teacher named John Smith. The problem was:

Which of the following three propositions has the greatest chance of success?

A. Six fair dice are tossed independently and at least one "6" appears.
B. Twelve fair dice are tossed independently and at least two "6"s appear.
C. Eighteen fair dice are tossed independently and at least three "6"s appear.

Pepys initially thought that outcome C had the highest probability, but Newton correctly concluded that outcome A actually has the highest probability.

== Solution ==
The probabilities of outcomes A, B and C are:

$$P(A)=1-\left(\frac{5}{6}\right)^{6} = \frac{31031}{46656} \approx 0.6651\, ,$$

$$P(B)=1-\sum_{x=0}^1\binom{12}{x}\left(\frac{1}{6}\right)^x\left(\frac{5}{6}\right)^{12-x}
= \frac{1346704211}{2176782336} \approx 0.6187\, ,$$

$$P(C)=1-\sum_{x=0}^2\binom{18}{x}\left(\frac{1}{6}\right)^x\left(\frac{5}{6}\right)^{18-x}
= \frac{15166600495229}{25389989167104} \approx 0.5973\, .$$

These results may be obtained by applying the binomial distribution (although Newton obtained them from first principles). In general, if P(n) is the probability of throwing at least n sixes with 6n dice, then:

$$P(n)=1-\sum_{x=0}^{n-1}\binom{6n}{x}\left(\frac{1}{6}\right)^x\left(\frac{5}{6}\right)^{6n-x}\, .$$

As n grows, P(n) decreases monotonically towards an asymptotic limit of 1/2.

== Example in R ==
The solution outlined above can be implemented in R as follows:

for (s in 1:3) {          # looking for s = 1, 2 or 3 sixes
  n = 6*s                 # ... in n = 6, 12 or 18 dice
  q = pbinom(s-1, n, 1/6) # q = Prob( <s sixes in n dice )
  cat("Probability of at least", s, "six in", n, "fair dice:", 1-q, "\n")
}

== Newton's explanation ==
Although Newton correctly calculated the odds of each bet, he provided a separate intuitive explanation to Pepys. He imagined that B and C toss their dice in groups of six, and said that A was most favorable because it required a 6 in only one toss, while B and C required a 6 in each of their tosses. This explanation assumes that a group does not produce more than one 6, so it does not actually correspond to the original problem.

== Generalizations ==
A natural generalization of the problem is to consider n non-necessarily fair dice, with p the probability that each die will select the 6 face when thrown (notice that actually the number of faces of the dice and which face should be selected are irrelevant). If r is the total number of dice selecting the 6 face, then $P(r \ge k ; n, p)$ is the probability of having at least k correct selections when throwing exactly n dice. Then the original Newton–Pepys problem can be generalized as follows:

Let $\nu_1, \nu_2$ be natural positive numbers s.t. $\nu_1 \le \nu_2$. Is then $P(r \ge \nu_1 k ; \nu_1 n, p)$ not smaller than $P(r \ge \nu_2 k ; \nu_2 n, p)$ for all n, p, k?

Notice that, with this notation, the original Newton–Pepys problem reads as: is $P(r \ge 1 ; 6, 1/6) \ge P(r \ge 2 ; 12, 1/6) \ge P(r \ge 3 ; 18, 1/6)$?

As noticed in Rubin and Evans (1961), there are no uniform answers to the generalized Newton–Pepys problem since answers depend on k, n and p. There are nonetheless some variations of the previous questions that admit uniform answers:

(from Chaundy and Bullard (1960)):

If $k_1, k_2, n$ are positive natural numbers, and $k_1 < k_2$, then $P(r \ge k_1 ; k_1 n, \frac{1}{n}) > P(r \ge k_2 ; k_2 n, \frac{1}{n})$.

If $k, n_1, n_2$ are positive natural numbers, and $n_1 < n_2$, then $P(r \ge k ; k n_1, \frac{1}{n_1}) > P(r \ge k ; k n_2, \frac{1}{n_2})$.

(from Varagnolo, Pillonetto and Schenato (2013)):

If $\nu_1, \nu_2 , n, k$ are positive natural numbers, and $\nu_1 \le \nu_2, k \le n, p \in [0, 1]$ then $P(r = \nu_1 k ; \nu_1 n, p) \ge P(r = \nu_2 k ; \nu_2 n, p)$.
