= Concentration dimension =

In mathematics — specifically, in probability theory — the concentration dimension of a Banach space-valued random variable is a numerical measure of how "spread out" the random variable is compared to the norm on the space.

== Definition ==
Let (B, || ||) be a Banach space and let X be a Gaussian random variable taking values in B. That is, for every linear functional ℓ in the dual space B^{∗}, the real-valued random variable ⟨ℓ, X⟩ has a normal distribution. Define

$$\sigma(X) = \sup \left\{ \left. \sqrt{\operatorname{E} [\langle \ell, X \rangle^{2}]} \,\right|\, \ell \in B^{\ast}, \| \ell \| \leq 1 \right\}.$$

Then the concentration dimension d(X) of X is defined by

$$d(X) = \frac{\operatorname{E} [\| X \|^{2}]}{\sigma(X)^{2}}.$$

== Examples ==
- If B is n-dimensional Euclidean space R^{n} with its usual Euclidean norm, and X is a standard Gaussian random variable, then σ(X) = 1 and E[||X||^{2}] = n, so d(X) = n.
- If B is R^{n} with the supremum norm, then σ(X) = 1 but E[||X||^{2}] (and hence d(X)) is of the order of log(n).
