= Maxwell's theorem =

Concept in probability theory

In probability theory, Maxwell's theorem (known also as Herschel-Maxwell's theorem and Herschel-Maxwell's derivation) states that if the probability distribution of a random vector in $\R^n$ is unchanged by rotations, and if the components are independent, then the components are identically distributed and normally distributed.

== Equivalent statements ==
If the probability distribution of a vector-valued random variable X = ( X_{1}, ..., X_{n} )^{T} is the same as the distribution of GX for every n×n orthogonal matrix G and the components are independent, then the components X_{1}, ..., X_{n} are normally distributed with expected value 0 and all have the same variance. This theorem is one of many characterizations of the normal distribution.

The only rotationally invariant probability distributions on R^{n} that have independent components are multivariate normal distributions with expected value 0 and variance σ^{2}I_{n}, (where I_{n} = the n×n identity matrix), for some positive number σ^{2}.

== History ==
John Herschel proved the theorem in 1850. Ten years later, James Clerk Maxwell proved the theorem in Proposition IV of his 1860 paper.

== Proof ==
We only need to prove the theorem for the 2-dimensional case, since we can then generalize the theorem to n-dimensions by sequentially applying the theorem for 2-dimensions to each pair of coordinates.

Since rotating by 90 degrees preserves the joint distribution, $X_1$ and $X_2$ have the same probability measure: let it be $\mu$. If $\mu$ is a Dirac delta distribution at zero, then it is, in particular, a degenerate gaussian distribution. Let us now assume that $\mu$ is not a Dirac delta distribution at zero.

By Lebesgue's decomposition theorem, we can decompose $\mu$ into a sum of a regular measure and an atomic measure: $\mu = \mu_r + \mu_s$. We need to show that $\mu_s = 0$; we proceed by contradiction. Suppose $\mu_s$ contains an atomic part, then there exists some $x\in \R$ such that $\mu_s(\{x\}) > 0$. By independence of $X_1, X_2$, the conditional variable $X_2 | \{X_1 = x\}$ is distributed the same way as $X_2$. Suppose $x=0$, then since we assumed $\mu$ is not concentrated at zero, $Pr(X_2 \neq 0) > 0$, and so the double ray $\{(x_1, x_2): x_1 = 0, x_2 \neq 0\}$ has nonzero probability. Now, by the rotational symmetry of $\mu \times \mu$, any rotation of the double ray also has the same nonzero probability, and since any two rotations are disjoint, their union has infinite probability, which is a contradiction.

Let $\mu$ have probability density function $\rho$; the problem reduces to solving the functional equation

$$\rho(x)\rho(y) = \rho(x \cos \theta + y \sin\theta)\rho(x \sin \theta - y \cos\theta).$$

== Sources ==
- Bryc, Wlodzimierz (1995). The Normal Distribution: Characterizations with Applications. Springer-Verlag. ISBN 978-0-387-97990-8.
- Feller, William (1966). An Introduction to Probability Theory and its Applications. Vol. II (1st ed.). Wiley. p. 187.
- Maxwell, James Clerk (1860). "Illustrations of the dynamical theory of gases". Philosophical Magazine. 4th Series. 19: 390–393.
