= Pregaussian class =

In probability theory, a pregaussian class or pregaussian set of functions is a set of functions, square integrable with respect to some probability measure, such that there exists a certain Gaussian process, indexed by this set, satisfying the conditions below.

== Definition ==
For a probability space (S, Σ, P), denote by $L^2_P(S)$ a set of square integrable with respect to P functions $f:S\to R$, that is

$$\int f^2 \, dP<\infty$$

Consider a set $\mathcal{F}\subset L^2_P(S)$. There exists a Gaussian process $G_P$, indexed by $\mathcal{F}$, with mean 0 and covariance

$$\operatorname{Cov} (G_P(f),G_P(g))= E G_P(f)G_P(g)=\int fg\, dP-\int f\,dP \int g\,dP\text{ for }f,g\in\mathcal{F}$$

Such a process exists because the given covariance is positive definite. This covariance defines a semi-inner product as well as a pseudometric on $L^2_P(S)$ given by

$$\varrho_P(f,g)=(E(G_P(f)-G_P(g))^2)^{1/2}$$

Definition A class $\mathcal{F}\subset L^2_P(S)$ is called pregaussian if for each $\omega\in S,$ the function $f\mapsto G_P(f)(\omega)$ on $\mathcal{F}$ is bounded, $\varrho_P$-uniformly continuous, and prelinear.

== Brownian bridge ==
The $G_P$ process is a generalization of the brownian bridge. Consider $S=[0,1],$ with P being the uniform measure. In this case, the $G_P$ process indexed by the indicator functions $I_{[0,x]}$, for $x\in [0,1],$ is in fact the standard brownian bridge B(x). This set of the indicator functions is pregaussian, moreover, it is the Donsker class.
