= SIPTA =

The Society for Imprecise Probability: Theories and Applications (SIPTA) was created in February 2002, with the aim of promoting the research on Imprecise probability. This is done through a series of activities for bringing together researchers from different groups, creating resources for information dissemination and documentation, and making other people aware of the potential of Imprecise Probability models.

== Background ==
The Society was originally created to manage the series of International Symposia on Imprecise Probabilities and Their Applications (ISIPTA). The first ISIPTA happened in 1999 in Ghent, Belgium; due to the success of the event, a second edition took place in Cornell, United States, in 2001. The Society was then created in Switzerland, during the year of 2002. The first general meeting of the Society happened during the third ISIPTA, in Lugano, Switzerland.

The Society is now concerned with many activities around the theme of imprecise probabilities. Imprecise probability is understood in a very wide sense. It is used as a generic term to cover all mathematical models which measure chance or uncertainty without sharp numerical probabilities. It includes both qualitative (comparative probability, partial preference orderings,...) and quantitative models (interval probabilities, belief functions, upper and lower previsions,...). Imprecise probability models are needed in inference problems where the relevant information is scarce, vague or conflicting, and in decision problems where preferences may also be incomplete.

== Bibliography ==
- Walley, Peter: Statistical reasoning with imprecise probabilities. London; New York: Chapman and Hall, 1991. Monographs on statistics and applied probability: 42. ISBN 0-412-28660-2.
