= Hidden Markov random field =

Concept in statistics

In statistics, a hidden Markov random field is a generalization of a hidden Markov model. Instead of having an underlying Markov chain, hidden Markov random fields have an underlying Markov random field.

Suppose that we observe a random variable $Y_i$, where $i \in S$. Hidden Markov random fields assume that the probabilistic nature of $Y_i$ is determined by the unobservable Markov random field $X_i$, $i \in S$. That is, given the neighbors $N_i$ of $X_i, X_i$ is independent of all other $X_j$ (Markov property). The main difference with a hidden Markov model is that neighborhood is not defined in 1 dimension but within a network, i.e. $X_i$ is allowed to have more than the two neighbors that it would have in a Markov chain. The model is formulated in such a way that given $X_i$, $Y_i$ are independent (conditional independence of the observable variables given the Markov random field).

In the vast majority of the related literature, the number of possible latent states is considered a user-defined constant. However, ideas from nonparametric Bayesian statistics, which allow for data-driven inference of the number of states, have been also recently investigated with success, e.g.

== See also ==
- Hidden Markov model
- Markov network
- Bayesian network
