= Stopped process =

Stochastic process

In mathematics, a stopped process is a stochastic process that is forced to assume the same value after a prescribed (possibly random) time.

== Definition ==
Let

- $(\Omega, \mathcal{F}, \mathbb{P})$ be a probability space;
- $(\mathbb{X}, \mathcal{A})$ be a measurable space;
- $X : [0, + \infty) \times \Omega \to \mathbb{X}$ be a stochastic process;
- $\tau : \Omega \to [0, + \infty]$ be a stopping time with respect to some filtration $\{ \mathcal{F}_{t} | t \geq 0 \}$ of ${}\mathcal{F}$.

Then the stopped process $X^{\tau}$ is defined for $t \geq 0$ and $\omega \in \Omega$ by

$$X_{t}^{\tau} (\omega) := X_{\min \{ t, \tau (\omega) \}} (\omega).$$

== Examples ==
=== Gambling ===
Consider a gambler playing roulette. X_{t} denotes the gambler's total holdings in the casino at time t ≥ 0, which may or may not be allowed to be negative, depending on whether or not the casino offers credit. Let Y_{t} denote what the gambler's holdings would be if he/she could obtain unlimited credit (so Y can attain negative values).

- Stopping at a deterministic time: suppose that the casino is prepared to lend the gambler unlimited credit, and that the gambler resolves to leave the game at a predetermined time T, regardless of the state of play. Then X is really the stopped process Y^{T}, since the gambler's account remains in the same state after leaving the game as it was in at the moment that the gambler left the game.
- Stopping at a random time: suppose that the gambler has no other sources of revenue, and that the casino will not extend its customers credit. The gambler resolves to play until and unless he/she goes broke. Then the random time
  $$\tau (\omega) := \inf \{ t \geq 0 | Y_{t} (\omega) = 0 \}$$
  is a stopping time for Y, and, since the gambler cannot continue to play after he/she has exhausted his/her resources, X is the stopped process Y^{τ}.

=== Brownian motion ===
Let $B : [0, + \infty) \times \Omega \to \mathbb{R}$ be one-dimensional standard Brownian motion starting at zero.

- Stopping at a deterministic time $T > 0$: if $\tau (\omega) \equiv T$, then the stopped Brownian motion $B^{\tau}$ will evolve as per usual up until time $T$, and thereafter will stay constant: i.e., $B_{t}^{\tau} (\omega) \equiv B_{T} (\omega)$ for all $t \geq T$.
- Stopping at a random time: define a random stopping time $\tau$ by the first hitting time for the region $\{ x \in \mathbb{R} | x \geq a \}$:
  $$\tau (\omega) := \inf \{ t > 0 | B_{t} (\omega) \geq a \}.$$
  Then the stopped Brownian motion $B^{\tau}$ will evolve as per usual up until the random time $\tau$, and will thereafter be constant with value $a$: i.e., $B_{t}^{\tau} (\omega) \equiv a$ for all $t \geq \tau (\omega)$.

== See also ==
- Killed process
