= Jump diffusion =

Type of stochastic process

Jump diffusion is a stochastic process that involves jumps and diffusion. It is a type of Lévy process. It has important applications in magnetic reconnection, coronal mass ejections, condensed matter physics, and pattern theory and computational vision.

== In physics ==
In crystals, atomic diffusion typically consists of jumps between vacant lattice sites. On time and length scales that average over many single jumps, the net motion of the jumping atoms can be described as regular diffusion.

Jump diffusion can be studied on a microscopic scale by inelastic neutron scattering and by Mößbauer spectroscopy. Closed expressions for the autocorrelation function have been derived for several jump(-diffusion) models:

- Singwi, Sjölander 1960: alternation between oscillatory motion and directed motion
- Chudley, Elliott 1961: jumps on a lattice
- Sears 1966, 1967: jump diffusion of rotational degrees of freedom
- Hall, Ross 1981: jump diffusion within a restricted volume

== In economics and finance ==
A jump-diffusion model is a form of mixture model, mixing a jump process and a diffusion process. In finance, jump-diffusion models were first introduced by Robert C. Merton. Such models have a range of financial applications from option pricing, to credit risk, to time series forecasting.

== In pattern theory, computer vision, and medical imaging ==
In pattern theory and computational vision in medical imaging, jump-diffusion processes were first introduced by Grenander and Miller as a form of random sampling algorithm that mixes "focus"-like motions, the diffusion processes, with saccade-like motions, via jump processes. The approach modelled sciences of electron-micrographs as containing multiple shapes, each having some fixed dimensional representation, with the collection of micrographs filling out the sample space corresponding to the unions of multiple finite-dimensional spaces. Using techniques from pattern theory, a posterior probability model was constructed over the countable union of sample space; this is therefore a hybrid system model, containing the discrete notions of object number along with the continuum notions of shape. The jump-diffusion process was constructed to have ergodic properties so that after initially flowing away from its initial condition it would generate samples from the posterior probability model.

== See also ==
- Jump process, an example of jump diffusion
- Piecewise-deterministic Markov process (PDMP), an example of jump diffusion and a generalization of the jump process
- Hybrid system (in the context of dynamical systems), a generalization of jump diffusion
- Lévy process
