= Telegraph process =

Memoryless continuous-time stochastic process that shows two distinct values

In probability theory, the telegraph process is a memoryless continuous-time stochastic process that shows two distinct values. It models burst noise (also called popcorn noise or random telegraph signal). If the two possible values that a random variable can take are $c_1$ and $c_2$, then the process can be described by the following master equations:

$$\partial_t P(c_1, t|x, t_0)=-\lambda_1 P(c_1, t|x, t_0)+\lambda_2 P(c_2, t|x, t_0)$$

and

$$\partial_t P(c_2, t|x, t_0)=\lambda_1 P(c_1, t|x, t_0)-\lambda_2 P(c_2, t|x, t_0).$$

where $\lambda_1$ is the transition rate for going from state $c_1$ to state $c_2$ and $\lambda_2$ is the transition rate for going from going from state $c_2$ to state $c_1$. The process is also known under the names Kac process (after mathematician Mark Kac), and dichotomous random process.

== Solution ==
The master equation is compactly written in a matrix form by introducing a vector $\mathbf{P}=[P(c_1, t|x, t_0),P(c_2, t|x, t_0)]$,

$$\frac{d\mathbf P}{dt}=W\mathbf P$$

where

$$W=\begin{pmatrix}
-\lambda_1 & \lambda_2 \\
\lambda_1 & -\lambda_2
\end{pmatrix}$$

is the transition rate matrix. The formal solution is constructed from the initial condition $\mathbf{P}(0)$ (that defines that at $t=t_0$, the state is $x$) by

$$\mathbf{P}(t) = e^{Wt}\mathbf{P}(0)$$.

It can be shown that

$$e^{Wt}= I+ W\frac{(1-e^{-2\lambda t})}{2\lambda}$$

where $I$ is the identity matrix and $\lambda=(\lambda_1+\lambda_2)/2$ is the average transition rate. As $t\rightarrow \infty$, the solution approaches a stationary distribution $\mathbf{P}(t\rightarrow \infty)=\mathbf{P}_s$ given by

$$\mathbf{P}_s= \frac{1}{2\lambda}\begin{pmatrix}
\lambda_2 \\
\lambda_1
\end{pmatrix}$$

== Properties ==
Knowledge of an initial state decays exponentially. Therefore, for a time $t\gg (2\lambda)^{-1}$, the process will reach the following stationary values, denoted by subscript s:

Mean:

$$\langle X \rangle_s = \frac {c_1\lambda_2+c_2\lambda_1}{\lambda_1+\lambda_2}.$$

Variance:

$$\operatorname{var} \{ X \}_s = \frac {(c_1-c_2)^2\lambda_1\lambda_2}{(\lambda_1+\lambda_2)^2}.$$

One can also calculate a correlation function:

$$\langle X(t),X(u)\rangle_s = e^{-2\lambda |t-u|}\operatorname{var} \{ X \}_s.$$

== Application ==
This random process finds wide application in model building:

- In physics, spin systems and fluorescence intermittency show dichotomous properties. But especially in single molecule experiments probability distributions featuring algebraic tails are used instead of the exponential distribution implied in all formulas above.
- In finance for describing share prices
- In biology for describing transcription factor binding and unbinding.

== See also ==
- Markov chain
- List of stochastic processes topics
- Random telegraph signal
