= Disorder problem =

In the study of stochastic processes in mathematics, a disorder problem or quickest detection problem (formulated by Kolmogorov) is the problem of using ongoing observations of a stochastic process to detect as soon as possible when the probabilistic properties of the process have changed. This is a type of change detection problem.

An example case is to detect the change in the drift parameter of a Wiener process.

== See also ==
- Compound Poisson process
