= Anderson's theorem =

On when a function on convex body K does not decrease if K is translated inwards

In mathematics, Anderson's theorem is a result in real analysis and geometry which says that the integral of an integrable, symmetric, unimodal, non-negative function f over an n-dimensional convex body K does not decrease if K is translated inwards towards the origin. This is a natural statement, since the graph of f can be thought of as a hill with a single peak over the origin; however, for n ≥ 2, the proof is not entirely obvious, as there may be points x of the body K where the value f(x) is larger than at the corresponding translate of x.

Anderson's theorem, named after Theodore Wilbur Anderson, also has an interesting application to probability theory.

== Statement of the theorem ==
Let K be a convex body in n-dimensional Euclidean space R^{n} that is symmetric with respect to reflection in the origin, i.e. K = −K. Let f : R^{n} → R be a non-negative, symmetric, globally integrable function; i.e.

- f(x) ≥ 0 for all x ∈ R^{n};
- f(x) = f(−x) for all x ∈ R^{n};
- $\int_{\mathbb{R}^{n}} f(x) \, \mathrm{d} x < + \infty.$

Suppose also that the super-level sets L(f, t) of f, defined by

$$L(f, t) = \{ x \in \mathbb{R}^{n} | f(x) \geq t \},$$

are convex subsets of R^{n} for every t ≥ 0. (This property is sometimes referred to as being unimodal.) Then, for any 0 ≤ c ≤ 1 and y ∈ R^{n},

$$\int_{K} f(x + c y) \, \mathrm{d} x \geq \int_{K} f(x + y) \, \mathrm{d} x.$$

== Application to probability theory ==
Given a probability space (Ω, Σ, Pr), suppose that X : Ω → R^{n} is an R^{n}-valued random variable with probability density function f : R^{n} → [0, +∞) and that Y : Ω → R^{n} is an independent random variable. The probability density functions of many well-known probability distributions are p-concave for some p, and hence unimodal. If they are also symmetric (e.g. the Laplace and normal distributions), then Anderson's theorem applies, in which case

$$\Pr ( X \in K ) \geq \Pr ( X + Y \in K )$$

for any origin-symmetric convex body K ⊆ R^{n}.
