= Method of moments (probability theory) =

In probability theory, the method of moments is a way of proving convergence in distribution by proving convergence of a sequence of moment sequences. Suppose X is a random variable and that all of the moments

$$\operatorname{E}(X^k)\,$$

exist. Further suppose the probability distribution of X is completely determined by its moments, i.e., there is no other probability distribution with the same sequence of moments (cf. the problem of moments). If

$$\lim_{n\to\infty}\operatorname{E}(X_n^k) = \operatorname{E}(X^k)\,$$

for all values of k, then the sequence {X_{n}} converges to X in distribution.

The method of moments was first introduced in 1891 by Pafnuty Chebyshev for proving the central limit theorem; although his proof is considered incomplete. Chebyshev cited earlier contributions by Irénée-Jules Bienaymé. More recently, the method has been applied by Eugene Wigner to prove Wigner's semicircle law, and has since found numerous applications in the theory of random matrices.
