= Memorylessness =

Waiting time property of certain probability distributions

In probability and statistics, memorylessness is a property of probability distributions. It describes situations where previous failures or elapsed time does not affect future trials or further wait time. Only the geometric and exponential distributions are memoryless.

== Definition ==
A random variable $X$ is memoryless if
$$\Pr(X>t+s \mid X>s)=\Pr(X>t)$$
where $\Pr$ is its probability mass function or probability density function when $X$ is discrete or continuous respectively and $t$ and $s$ are nonnegative numbers. In discrete cases, the definition describes the first success in an infinite sequence of independent and identically distributed Bernoulli trials, like the number of coin flips until landing heads. In continuous situations, memorylessness models random phenomena, like the time between two earthquakes. The memorylessness property asserts that the number of previously failed trials or the elapsed time is independent, or has no effect, on the future trials or lead time.

The equality characterizes the geometric and exponential distributions in discrete and continuous contexts respectively. In other words, the geometric random variable is the only discrete memoryless distribution and the exponential random variable is the only continuous memoryless distribution.

In discrete contexts, the definition is altered to $\Pr(X>t+s \mid X \geq s)=\Pr(X>t)$ when the geometric distribution starts at $0$ instead of $1$ so the equality is still satisfied.

== Characterization of exponential distribution ==
If a continuous probability distribution is memoryless, then it must be the exponential distribution.

From the memorylessness property,
$$\Pr(X>t+s \mid X>s)=\Pr(X>t).$$
The definition of conditional probability reveals that
$$\frac{\Pr(X > t + s)}{\Pr(X > s)} = \Pr(X > t).$$
Rearranging the equality with the survival function, $S(t) = \Pr(X > t)$, gives
$$S(t + s) = S(t) S(s).$$
This implies that for any natural number $k$
$$S(kt) = S(t)^k.$$
Similarly, by dividing the input of the survival function and taking the $k$-th root,
$$S\left(\frac{t}{k}\right) = S(t)^{\frac{1}{k}}.$$
In general, the equality is true for any rational number in place of $k$. Since the survival function is continuous and rational numbers are dense in the real numbers (in other words, there is always a rational number arbitrarily close to any real number), the equality also holds for the reals. As a result,
$$S(t) = S(1)^t = e^{t \ln S(1)} = e^{-\lambda t}$$
where $\lambda = -\ln S(1) \geq 0$. This is the survival function of the exponential distribution.

== Characterization of geometric distribution ==
If a discrete probability distribution is memoryless, then it must be the geometric distribution.

From the memorylessness property,
$$\Pr(X>t+s \mid X\geq s)=\Pr(X>t).$$
The definition of conditional probability reveals that
$$\frac{\Pr(X > t + s)}{\Pr(X \geq s)} = \Pr(X > t).$$
From this it can be proven by induction that
$$\Pr(X > k) = \Pr(X > 1)^k.$$
Then it follows that
$$f_X(x)=\Pr(X\leq x)=1-\Pr(X>x)=1-\Pr(X>1)^x,$$
and if we let
$$p := 1 - \Pr(X>1) \in [0, 1]$$
we can easily see that $X$ is geometrically distributed with some parameter $p$; in other words
$$X\sim \operatorname{Geo}(p).$$
