= Weingarten function =

Rational mathematical function indexed by integer partitions

In mathematics, Weingarten functions are rational functions indexed by partitions of integers that can be used to calculate integrals of products of matrix coefficients over classical groups. They were first studied by Weingarten (1978) who found their asymptotic behavior, and named by Collins (2003), who evaluated them explicitly for the unitary group.

== Unitary groups ==
Weingarten functions are used for evaluating integrals over the unitary group U_{d} of products of matrix coefficients.

Consider in general an integral of the form
$$\int_{U_d} U_{i_1j_1}\cdots U_{i_nj_n}U^*_{i^\prime_1j^\prime_1}\cdots U^*_{i^\prime_{n'}j^\prime_{n'}}dU,$$
It can be shown that the integral would be zero, unless $n = n'$. Thus, consider only integrals of the form
$$\int_{U_d} U_{i_1j_1}\cdots U_{i_nj_n}U^*_{i^\prime_1j^\prime_1}\cdots U^*_{i^\prime_nj^\prime_n}dU,$$
where $*$ denotes complex conjugation. Note that $U^*_{ji}=(U^\dagger)_{ij}$ where $U^\dagger$ is the conjugate transpose of $U$, so one can interpret the above expression as being for the $i_1j_1\ldots i_nj_nj'_1i'_1\ldots j'_ni'_n$ matrix element of $U\otimes\cdots\otimes U\otimes U^\dagger\otimes\cdots\otimes U^\dagger$.

This integral is equal to
$$\sum_{\sigma,\tau\in S_n}\delta_{i_1i^\prime_{\sigma(1)}}\cdots\delta_{i_ni^\prime_{\sigma(n)}} \delta_{j_1j^\prime_{\tau(1)}}\cdots\delta_{j_nj^\prime_{\tau(n)}}W_{\sigma, \tau}(d)$$
where $W_{\sigma, \tau}(d) = \operatorname{Wg}(\sigma\tau^{-1},d)$, and $\operatorname{Wg}$ is the Weingarten function, given by
$$\operatorname{Wg}(\sigma,d) = \frac{1}{n!^2}\sum_{\lambda}\frac{\chi^\lambda(1)^2\chi^\lambda(\sigma)}{s_{\lambda,d}(1)}$$
where the sum is over all partitions λ of n (Collins 2003). Here χ^{λ} is the character of S_{n} corresponding to the partition λ and s is the Schur polynomial of λ, so that s_{λ,d}(1) is the dimension of the representation of U_{d} corresponding to λ.

The Weingarten functions are rational functions in d. They can have poles for small values of d, which cancel out in the formula above. There is an alternative inequivalent definition of Weingarten functions, where one only sums over partitions with at most d parts. This is no longer a rational function of d, but is finite for all positive integers d. The two sorts of Weingarten functions coincide for d larger than n, and either can be used in the formula for the integral.

The integrals are called the link integrals in $U(N)$ lattice gauge theory. See for a graphical method for evaluating these integrals, inspired by quantum string diagrams.

=== Examples of Weingarten functions ===
The first few Weingarten functions
$$\begin{aligned}
\operatorname{Wg}(,d) &= 1\\
\operatorname{Wg}(1,d) &= \frac{1}{d}\\
\operatorname{Wg}(2,d) &= \frac{-1}{d(d^2-1)}\\
\operatorname{Wg}(1^2,d) &= \frac{1}{d^2-1}\\
\operatorname{Wg}(3,d) &= \frac{2}{d(d^2-1)(d^2-4)}\\
\operatorname{Wg}(21,d) &= \frac{-1}{(d^2-1)(d^2-4)}\\
\operatorname{Wg}(1^3,d) &= \frac{d^2-2}{d(d^2-1)(d^2-4)}\\
\operatorname{Wg}(4,d) &= \frac{-5}{d(d^2-1)(d^2-4)(d^2-9)} \\
\operatorname{Wg}(31,d) &= \frac{2d^2-3}{d^2(d^2-1)(d^2-4)(d^2-9)} \\
\operatorname{Wg}(2^2,d) &= \frac{d^2+6}{d^2(d^2-1)(d^2-4)(d^2-9)} \\
\operatorname{Wg}(21^2,d) &= \frac{-1}{d(d^2-1)(d^2-9)} \\
\operatorname{Wg}(1^4,d) &= \frac{d^4-8d^2+6}{d^2(d^2-1)(d^2-4)(d^2-9)}
\end{aligned}$$
where permutations σ are denoted by their cycle shapes. For example, in $\operatorname{Wg}(,d) = 1$, the permutation is the trivial permutation on 0 elements. In $\operatorname{Wg}(21^2,d) = \frac{-1}{d(d^2-1)(d^2-9)}$, the permutation is the permutation on 4 elements that preserves 2 elements, and exchanges 2 elements.

There exist computer algebra programs to produce these expressions.

=== Examples of link integrals ===
$$\begin{aligned}
\int_{U_d} dU U_{ij} \bar U_{k\ell}
&= \delta_{ik}\delta_{j\ell} \operatorname{Wg}(1,d) = \frac{\delta_{ik}\delta_{j\ell}}{d} \\
\int_{U_d} dU U_{ij} U_{k\ell} \bar U_{mn} \bar U_{pq}
&= (\delta_{im}\delta_{jn} \delta_{kp}\delta_{\ell q} + \delta_{ip}\delta_{jq} \delta_{km}\delta_{\ell n} ) \operatorname{Wg}(1^2,d) + (\delta_{im} \delta_{jq} \delta_{kp}\delta_{\ell n} + \delta_{ip} \delta_{jn} \delta_{km}\delta_{\ell q}) \operatorname{Wg}(2,d) \\
\int_{U_d} dU \; \overline{U_{11} U_{22} U_{33}} U_{12} U_{23} U_{31}
&= \operatorname{Wg}(3,d) = \frac{2}{d(d^2-1)(d^2-4)}
\end{aligned}$$

=== Asymptotics ===
Given a permutation $\sigma$, there is a trivial part and a nontrivial part. The trivial part fixes elements, and the nontrivial part permutes the elements in cycles. This can be written out in the cycle notation for permutations. For example, the following permutation $(123)(45)(6)(7)(8)$ has the nontrivial part $(123)(45)$.

Given a fixed permutation $\sigma$ on $n$ elements, as the size of the unitary group grows to $d \to \infty$, we have the asymptotic formula
$$\operatorname{Wg}(\sigma,d) = d^{-n-|\sigma|}\left[\prod_{C_i \in \sigma}(-1)^{|C_i|-1}c_{|C_i|-1} +O(d^{-2})\right]$$
where $C_1, C_2, \dots$ are the cycles of $\sigma$, $|C_i|$ is the length of cycle $C_i$, $c_n := \frac{(2n)!}{n!(n+1)!}$ is a Catalan number, and $|\sigma|$ is the smallest number of transpositions (pairwise exchange) that $\sigma$ is composed of. This formula can be used to prove that the algebra of the gaussian unitary ensemble converges to the free probability algebra.

Higher order expansions exist, of the form $d^{-n - |\sigma|}(a_0 + a_2 d^{-2}+ a_4 d^{-4} + \cdots)$ where $a_0$ is given above, and $a_2, a_4, \dots$ are real numbers that depend on $\sigma$ but not $d$. The full expansion is:
$$W_{\rho \sigma}(d)=\frac{(-1)^{\left|\rho^{-1} \sigma\right|}}{d^{n+\left|\rho^{-1} \sigma\right|}} \sum_{k=0}^{\infty} \frac{\vec{W}_k(\rho, \sigma)}{d^{2 k}},$$
where $\vec{W}_k(\rho, \sigma)$ is the number of weakly monotone walks on $S_n$ from $\rho$ to $\sigma$ of length $\left|\rho^{-1} \sigma\right|+2 k$. To define weakly monotone walk, we construct the Cayley graph of $S_n$. Each directed edge is obtained by multiplying on the right by a transposition. Now, a weakly monotone walk on the Cayley graph is a path $(i_1 j_1), (i_2 j_2), \dots$ such that $j_1 \leq j_2 \leq \cdots$.

There exists a diagrammatic method to systematically calculate the integrals over the unitary group as a power series in 1/d.

=== Example asymptotics ===
Let $\sigma=(123)(45)(6)(7)(8)$. It acts on $n=8$ elements. It decomposes into cycles with lengths $|C_1|=3$, $|C_2|=2$, $|C_3|=|C_4|=|C_5|=1$.

Applying $|\sigma|=n-k$ with $k=5$ cycles gives $|\sigma|=3$.

The Catalan factors are $c_{2}=2$ for the 3-cycle, $c_{1}=1$ for the 2-cycle, and $c_{0}=1$ for each 1-cycle, so the product in the leading term equals $(-1)^{2}c_{2}\cdot(-1)^{1}c_{1}\cdot1^{3}=-2$.

Therefore the leading asymptotic term is $\operatorname{Wg}(\sigma,d)=-2d^{-11}+O(d^{-13})$.

Notice that in the above calculation, the trivial part $|C_3|=|C_4|=|C_5|=1$ did not matter at all. This is because $(-1)^{|C_i|-1}c_{|C_i|-1} = 1$ in that case. Thus in general, the asymptotic expression depends only on the nontrivial part of the permutation.

== Orthogonal and symplectic groups ==
For orthogonal and symplectic groups the Weingarten functions were evaluated by Collins & Śniady (2006). Their theory is similar to the case of the unitary group. They are parameterized by partitions such that all parts have even size.
