= Continuous stochastic process =

Stochastic process that is a continuous function of time or index parameter

In probability theory, a continuous stochastic process is a type of stochastic process that may be said to be "continuous" as a function of its "time" or index parameter. Continuity is a nice property for (the sample paths of) a process to have, since it implies that they are well-behaved in some sense, and, therefore, much easier to analyze. It is implicit here that the index of the stochastic process is a continuous variable. Some authors define a "continuous (stochastic) process" as only requiring that the index variable be continuous, without continuity of sample paths: in another terminology, this would be a continuous-time stochastic process, in parallel to a "discrete-time process". Given the possible confusion, caution is needed.

== Definitions ==
Let (Ω, Σ, P) be a probability space, let T be some interval of time, and let X : T × Ω → S be a stochastic process. For simplicity, the rest of this article will take the state space S to be the real line R, but the definitions go through mutatis mutandis if S is R^{n}, a normed vector space, or even a general metric space.

=== Continuity almost surely ===
Given a time t ∈ T, X is said to be continuous with probability one at t if

$$\mathbf{P} \left( \left\{ \omega \in \Omega \left| \lim_{s \to t} \big| X_{s} (\omega) - X_{t} (\omega) \big| = 0 \right. \right\} \right) = 1.$$

=== Mean-square continuity ===
Given a time t ∈ T, X is said to be continuous in mean-square at t if E[|X_{t}|^{2}] < +∞ and

$$\lim_{s \to t} \mathbf{E} \left[ \big| X_{s} - X_{t} \big|^{2} \right] = 0.$$

=== Continuity in probability ===
Given a time t ∈ T, X is said to be continuous in probability at t if, for all ε > 0,

$$\lim_{s \to t} \mathbf{P} \left( \left\{ \omega \in \Omega \left| \big| X_{s} (\omega) - X_{t} (\omega) \big| \geq \varepsilon \right. \right\} \right) = 0.$$

or equivalently

$$\lim_{s \to t} \mathbf{P} \left( \left\{ \omega \in \Omega \left| \big| X_{s} (\omega) - X_{t} (\omega) \big| < \varepsilon \right. \right\} \right) = 1.$$

Also equivalent, X is continuous in probability at time t if

$$\lim_{s \to t} \mathbf{E} \left[ \frac{\big| X_{s} - X_{t} \big|}{1 + \big| X_{s} - X_{t} \big|} \right] = 0.$$

=== Continuity in distribution ===
Given a time t ∈ T, X is said to be continuous in distribution at t if

$$\lim_{s \to t} F_{s} (x) = F_{t} (x)$$

for all points x at which F_{t} is continuous, where F_{t} denotes the cumulative distribution function of the random variable X_{t}.

=== Sample continuity ===
X is said to be sample continuous if X_{t}(ω) is continuous in t for P-almost all ω ∈ Ω. Sample continuity is the appropriate notion of continuity for processes such as Itō diffusions.

=== Feller continuity ===
X is said to be a Feller-continuous process if, for any fixed t ∈ T and any bounded, continuous and Σ-measurable function g : S → R, E^{x}[g(X_{t})] depends continuously upon x. Here x denotes the initial state of the process X, and E^{x} denotes expectation conditional upon the event that X starts at x.

== Relationships ==
The relationships between the various types of continuity of stochastic processes are akin to the relationships between the various types of convergence of random variables. In particular:

- continuity with probability one implies continuity in probability;
- continuity in mean-square implies continuity in probability;
- continuity with probability one neither implies, nor is implied by, continuity in mean-square;
- continuity in probability implies, but is not implied by, continuity in distribution.

It is tempting to confuse continuity with probability one with sample continuity. Continuity with probability one at time t means that P(A_{t}) = 0, where the event A_{t} is given by

$$A_{t} = \left\{ \omega \in \Omega \left| \lim_{s \to t} \big| X_{s} (\omega) - X_{t} (\omega) \big| \neq 0 \right. \right\},$$

and it is perfectly feasible to check whether or not this holds for each t ∈ T. Sample continuity, on the other hand, requires that P(A) = 0, where

$$A = \bigcup_{t \in T} A_{t}.$$

A is an uncountable union of events, so it may not actually be an event itself, so P(A) may be undefined! Even worse, even if A is an event, P(A) can be strictly positive even if P(A_{t}) = 0 for every t ∈ T. This is the case, for example, with the telegraph process.
