= Sample-continuous process =

In mathematics, a sample-continuous process is a stochastic process whose sample paths are almost surely continuous functions.

== Definition ==
Let (Ω, Σ, P) be a probability space. Let X : I × Ω → S be a stochastic process, where the index set I and state space S are both topological spaces. Then the process X is called sample-continuous (or almost surely continuous, or simply continuous) if the map X(ω) : I → S is continuous as a function of topological spaces for P-almost all ω in Ω.

In many examples, the index set I is an interval of time, [0, T] or [0, +∞), and the state space S is the real line or n-dimensional Euclidean space R^{n}.

== Examples ==
- Brownian motion (the Wiener process) on Euclidean space is sample-continuous.
- For "nice" parameters of the equations, solutions to stochastic differential equations are sample-continuous. See the existence and uniqueness theorem in the stochastic differential equations article for some sufficient conditions to ensure sample continuity.
- The process X : [0, +∞) × Ω → R that makes equiprobable jumps up or down every unit time according to

$$\begin{cases} X_{t} \sim \mathrm{Unif} (\{X_{t-1} - 1, X_{t-1} + 1\}), & t \mbox{ an integer;} \\ X_{t} = X_{\lfloor t \rfloor}, & t \mbox{ not an integer;} \end{cases}$$

is not sample-continuous. In fact, it is surely discontinuous.

== Properties ==
- For sample-continuous processes, the finite-dimensional distributions determine the law, and vice versa.

== See also ==
- Continuous stochastic process
