= Finite-dimensional distribution =

Mathematics concept

In mathematics, finite-dimensional distributions are a tool in the study of measures and stochastic processes. A lot of information can be gained by studying the "projection" of a measure (or process) onto a finite-dimensional vector space (or finite collection of times). It can be described using a multivariate normal distribution system for any number of coordinates.

== Finite-dimensional distributions of a measure ==
Let $(X, \mathcal{F}, \mu)$ be a measure space. The finite-dimensional distributions of $\mu$ are the pushforward measures $f_{*} (\mu)$, where $f : X \to \mathbb{R}^{k}$, $k \in \mathbb{N}$, is any measurable function.

== Finite-dimensional distributions of a stochastic process ==
Let $(\Omega, \mathcal{F}, \mathbb{P})$ be a probability space and let $X : I \times \Omega \to \mathbb{X}$ be a stochastic process. The finite-dimensional distributions of $X$ are the push forward measures $\mathbb{P}_{i_{1} \dots i_{k}}^{X}$ on the product space $\mathbb{X}^{k}$ for $k \in \mathbb{N}$ defined by

$$\mathbb{P}_{i_{1} \dots i_{k}}^{X} (S) := \mathbb{P} \left\{ \omega \in \Omega \left| \left( X_{i_{1}} (\omega), \dots, X_{i_{k}} (\omega) \right) \in S \right. \right\}.$$

Very often, this condition is stated in terms of measurable rectangles:

$$\mathbb{P}_{i_{1} \dots i_{k}}^{X} (A_{1} \times \cdots \times A_{k}) := \mathbb{P} \left\{ \omega \in \Omega \left| X_{i_{j}} (\omega) \in A_{j} \mathrm{\,for\,} 1 \leq j \leq k \right. \right\}.$$

The definition of the finite-dimensional distributions of a process $X$ is related to the definition for a measure $\mu$ in the following way: recall that the law $\mathcal{L}_{X}$ of $X$ is a measure on the collection $\mathbb{X}^{I}$ of all functions from $I$ into $\mathbb{X}$. In general, this is an infinite-dimensional space. The finite dimensional distributions of $X$ are the push forward measures $f_{*} \left( \mathcal{L}_{X} \right)$ on the finite-dimensional product space $\mathbb{X}^{k}$, where

$$f : \mathbb{X}^{I} \to \mathbb{X}^{k} : \sigma \mapsto \left( \sigma (t_{1}), \dots, \sigma (t_{k}) \right)$$

is the natural "evaluate at times $t_{1}, \dots, t_{k}$" function.

== Relation to tightness ==
It can be shown that if a sequence of probability measures $(\mu_{n})_{n = 1}^{\infty}$ is tight and all the finite-dimensional distributions of the $\mu_{n}$ converge weakly to the corresponding finite-dimensional distributions of some probability measure $\mu$, then $\mu_{n}$ converges weakly to $\mu$.

== See also ==
- Law (stochastic processes)
