= Subordinator (mathematics) =

In probability theory, a subordinator is a stochastic process that is non-negative and whose increments are stationary and independent. Subordinators are a special class of Lévy process that play an important role in the theory of local time. In this context, subordinators describe the evolution of time within another stochastic process, the subordinated stochastic process. In other words, a subordinator will determine the random number of "time steps" that occur within the subordinated process for a given unit of chronological time.

In order to be a subordinator a process must be a Lévy process. It also must be increasing, almost surely, or an additive process.

== Definition ==
A subordinator is a real-valued stochastic process $X=(X_t)_{t \geq 0}$ that is a non-negative and a Lévy process. Subordinators are the stochastic processes $X=(X_t)_{t \geq 0}$ that have all of the following properties:

- $X_0=0$ almost surely
- $X$ is non-negative, meaning $X_t \geq 0$ for all $t$
- $X$ has stationary increments, meaning that for $t \geq 0$ and $h > 0$, the distribution of the random variable $Y_{t,h}:=X_{t+h} - X_t$ depends only on $h$ and not on $t$
- $X$ has independent increments, meaning that for all $n$ and all $t_0 < t_1 < \dots < t_n$ , the random variables $(Y_i)_{i=0, \dots, n-1}$ defined by $Y_i=X_{t_{i+1}}-X_{t_{i}}$ are independent of each other
- The paths of $X$ are càdlàg, meaning they are continuous from the right everywhere and the limits from the left exist everywhere

== Examples ==
The variance gamma process can be described as a Brownian motion subject to a gamma subordinator. If a Brownian motion, $W(t)$, with drift $\theta t$ is subjected to a random time change which follows a gamma process, $\Gamma(t; 1, \nu)$, the variance gamma process will follow:

$$X^{VG}(t; \sigma, \nu, \theta) \;:=\; \theta \,\Gamma(t; 1, \nu) + \sigma\,W(\Gamma(t; 1, \nu)).$$

The Cauchy process can be described as a Brownian motion subject to a Lévy subordinator.

== Representation ==
Every subordinator $X=(X_t)_{t \geq 0}$ can be written as

$$X_t = at + \int_0^t  \int_0^\infty x  \; \Theta(  \mathrm ds \; \mathrm  dx )$$

where

- $a \geq 0$ is a scalar and
- $\Theta$ is a Poisson process on $(0, \infty) \times (0, \infty)$ with intensity measure $\operatorname E \Theta = \lambda \otimes \mu$. Here $\mu$ is a measure on $(0, \infty )$ with $\int_0^\infty \max(x,1) \; \mu (\mathrm dx) < \infty$, and $\lambda$ is the Lebesgue measure.

The measure $\mu$ is called the Lévy measure of the subordinator, and the pair $(a, \mu)$ is called the characteristics of the subordinator.

Conversely, any scalar $a \geq 0$ and measure $\mu$ on $(0, \infty)$ with $\int \max(x,1) \; \mu (\mathrm dx) < \infty$ define a subordinator with characteristics $(a, \mu)$ by the above relation.
