= Infinite divisibility (probability) =

Type of probability distribution

In probability theory, a probability distribution is infinitely divisible if it can be expressed as the probability distribution of the sum of an arbitrary number of independent and identically distributed (i.i.d.) random variables. The characteristic function of any infinitely divisible distribution is then called an infinitely divisible characteristic function.

More rigorously, the probability distribution F is infinitely divisible if, for every positive integer n, there exist i.i.d. random variables X_{n1}, ..., X_{nn} whose sum S_{n} = X_{n1} + ... + X_{nn} has the same distribution F.

The concept of infinite divisibility of probability distributions was introduced in 1929 by Bruno de Finetti. This type of decomposition of a distribution is used in probability and statistics to find families of probability distributions that might be natural choices for certain models or applications. Infinitely divisible distributions play an important role in probability theory in the context of limit theorems.

== Examples ==
Examples of continuous distributions that are infinitely divisible are all members of the stable distribution family, which includes the normal distribution, the Cauchy distribution, and the Lévy distribution. Outside the stable class, some examples are the gamma distribution, the chi-square distribution, the Wald distribution, the log-normal distribution and Student's t-distribution.

Among the discrete distributions, examples are the Poisson distribution and the negative binomial distribution (and hence the geometric distribution also). The one-point distribution whose only possible outcome is 0 is also (trivially) infinitely divisible.

The uniform distribution and the binomial distribution are not infinitely divisible, nor are any other distributions with bounded support (≈ finite-sized domain), other than the one-point distribution mentioned above. The distribution of the reciprocal of a random variable having a Student's t-distribution is also not infinitely divisible.

Any compound Poisson distribution is infinitely divisible; this follows immediately from the definition.

== Limit theorem ==
Infinitely divisible distributions appear in a broad generalization of the central limit theorem: the limit as n → +∞ of the sum S_{n} = X_{n1} + ... + X_{nn} of independent uniformly asymptotically negligible (u.a.n.) random variables within a triangular array

$\begin{array}{cccc} X_{11} \\ X_{21} & X_{22} \\ X_{31} & X_{32} & X_{33} \\ \vdots & \vdots & \vdots & \ddots \end{array}$

approaches – in the weak sense – an infinitely divisible distribution. The uniformly asymptotically negligible (u.a.n.) condition is given by

$\lim_{n\to\infty} \, \max_{1 \le k \le n} \; P( \left| X_{nk} \right| > \varepsilon ) = 0 \text{ for every }\varepsilon > 0.$

Thus, for example, if the uniform asymptotic negligibility (u.a.n.) condition is satisfied via an appropriate scaling of identically distributed random variables with finite variance, the weak convergence is to the normal distribution in the classical version of the central limit theorem. More generally, if the u.a.n. condition is satisfied via a scaling of identically distributed random variables (with not necessarily finite second moment), then the weak convergence is to a stable distribution. On the other hand, for a triangular array of independent (unscaled) Bernoulli random variables where the u.a.n. condition is satisfied through

$\lim_{n\rightarrow\infty} np_n = \lambda,$

the weak convergence of the sum is to the Poisson distribution with mean λ as shown by the familiar proof of the law of small numbers.

== Lévy process ==
Every infinitely divisible probability distribution corresponds in a natural way to a Lévy process. A Lévy process is a stochastic process { L_{t} | t ≥ 0 } with stationary independent increments, where stationary means that for s < t, the probability distribution of L_{t} − L_{s} depends only on t − s and where independent increments means that that difference L_{t} − L_{s} is independent of the corresponding difference on any interval not overlapping with [s, t], and similarly for any finite number of mutually non-overlapping intervals.

If { L_{t} | t ≥ 0 } is a Lévy process then, for any t ≥ 0, the random variable L_{t} will be infinitely divisible: for any n, we can choose (X_{n1}, X_{n2}, ..., X_{nn}) = (L_{t/n} − L_{0}, L_{2t/n} − L_{t/n}, ..., L_{t} − L_{(n−1)t/n}). Similarly, L_{t} − L_{s} is infinitely divisible for any s < t.

On the other hand, if F is an infinitely divisible distribution, we can construct a Lévy process { L_{t} | t ≥ 0 } from it. For any interval [s, t] where t − s > 0 equals a rational number p/q, we can define L_{t} − L_{s} to have the same distribution as X_{q1} + X_{q2} + ... + X_{qp}. Irrational values of t − s > 0 are handled via a continuity argument.

== Additive process ==
An additive process $\{X_t\}_{t \geq 0}$ (a cadlag, continuous in probability stochastic process with independent increments) has an infinitely divisible distribution for any $>t\geq 0$. Let $\{\mu_t\}_{t\geq0}$ be its family of infinitely divisible distributions. $\{\mu_t\}_{t\geq0}$ satisfies a number of conditions of continuity and monotonicity. Moreover, if a family of infinitely divisible distributions $\{\mu_t\}_{t\geq0}$ satisfies these continuity and monotonicity conditions, there exists (uniquely in law) an additive process $\{\mu_t\}_{t\geq0}$ with this distribution.

== Lévy–Khintchine formula ==
Let $\phi(t)$ be the characteristic function of an infinitely divisible distribution. Then there exists a non-decreasing function of bounded variation $G(u)$ and a real constant $\delta$ such that

$\ln \phi(t) = i \delta t + \int\limits_{-\infty}^{\infty}\left(e^{itu} - 1 - \frac{itu}{1+u^2}\right)\left(\frac{1+u^2}{u^2}\right)dG(u).$

== Infinitely divisible distribution on locally compact Abelian groups ==
A probability distribution $\mu$ on a locally compact Abelian group $X$ is called infinitely divisible if for every natural number $n$ there exists an element $x_n \in X$ and a probability distribution $\mu_n$ on $X$ such that $\mu = \mu_n^{*n} * E_{x_n}$, where $E_{x_n}$ is the degenerate (Dirac) distribution concentrated at $x_n$; see also. This definition is slightly different from the classical one in the case of the real line.

Examples of infinitely divisible distributions on a locally compact Abelian group $X$ include degenerate distributions, Haar distributions on compact subgroups of $X$, Gaussian distributions, and generalized Poisson distributions.

An analogue of the Lévy–Khintchine formula for infinitely divisible distributions on locally compact Abelian groups was obtained in; see also.
