= Additive process =

Cadlag in probability theory

An additive process, in probability theory, is a cadlag, continuous in probability stochastic process with independent increments. An additive process is the generalization of a Lévy process (a Lévy process is an additive process with stationary increments). An example of an additive process that is not a Lévy process is a Brownian motion with a time-dependent drift. The additive process was introduced by Paul Lévy in 1937.

There are applications of the additive process in quantitative finance (this family of processes can capture important features of the implied volatility) and in digital image processing.

== Definition ==
An additive process is a generalization of a Lévy process obtained relaxing the hypothesis of stationary increments. Thanks to this feature an additive process can describe more complex phenomenons than a Lévy process.

A stochastic process $\{X_t\}_{t \geq 0}$ on $\mathbb R^d$ such that $X_0=0$ almost surely is an additive process if it satisfy the following hypothesis:

1. It has independent increments.
2. It is continuous in probability.

== Main properties ==
=== Independent increments ===
A stochastic process $\{X_t\}_{t \geq 0}$ has independent increments if and only if for any $0\leq p<r\leq s<t$ the random variable $X_t-X_s$ is independent from the random variable $X_r-X_p$.

=== Continuity in probability ===
A stochastic process $\{X_t\}_{t \geq 0}$ is continuous in probability if, and only if, for any $t>0$

$\lim_{s \to t^-} \Pr \left(\big| X_s- X_t \big| \geq \varepsilon \right) = 0.$

== Lévy–Khintchine representation ==
There is a strong link between additive process and infinitely divisible distributions. An additive process at time $t$ has an infinitely divisible distribution characterized by the generating triplet $(\gamma_t, A_t, \nu_t)$. $\gamma_t$ is a vector in $\mathbb R^d$, $A_t$ is a matrix in $\mathbb R^{d\times d}$ and $\nu_t$ is a measure on $\mathbb R^d$ such that $\nu_t(\{0\})=0$ and $\int_{\mathbb R^d}(1\wedge x^2)\nu_t(dx)<\infty$.

$\gamma_t$ is called drift term, $A_t$ covariance matrix and $\nu_t$ Lévy measure. It is possible to write explicitly the additive process characteristic function using the Lévy–Khintchine formula:

$$\varphi_X(u)(t) := \operatorname E \left[e^{iu'X_t}\right] = \exp \left(u' \gamma_t i - \frac{1}{2}u' A_t u + \int_{\mathbb R^d} \left(e^{i u' x}-1 -iu'x\mathbf{I}_{|x|<1}\right)\,\nu_t(dx) \right),$$

where $u$ is a vector in $\mathbb R^d$ and $\mathbf{I_C}$ is the indicator function of the set $C$.

A Lèvy process characteristic function has the same structure but with $\gamma_t =t\gamma, \nu_t = t\nu$ and $A_t = At$ with $\gamma$ a vector in $\mathbb R^d$, $A$ a positive definite matrix in $\mathbb R^{d \times d}$ and $\nu$ is a measure on $\mathbb R^d$.

== Existence and uniqueness in law of additive process ==
The following result together with the Lévy–Khintchine formula characterizes the additive process.

Let $\{X_t\}_{t \geq 0}$ be an additive process on $\mathbb R^d$. Then, its infinitely divisible distribution is such that:

1. For all $t$, $A_t$ is a positive definite matrix.
2. $\gamma_0=0, A_0=0, \nu_0=0$ and for all $s, t$ is such that $s<t$, $A_t-A_s$ is a positive definite matrix and $\nu_t(B)\geq \nu_s(B)$ for every $B$ in $\mathbf{B}(\mathbb R^d)$.
3. If $s\to t$ $\gamma_s\to \gamma_t, A_s \to A_t$ and $\nu_s(B)\to \nu_t(B)$ every $B$ in $\mathbf{B}(\mathbb R^d)$, $0\not\in B$.

Conversely for family of infinitely divisible distributions characterized by a generating triplet $(\gamma_t, A_t, \nu_t)$ that satisfies 1, 2 and 3, it exists an additive process $\{X_t\}_{t \geq 0}$ with this distribution.

== Subclass of additive process ==
=== Additive Logistic Process ===
Family of additive processes with generalized logistic distribution. Their 5 parameters characteristic function is

$$\operatorname E \left[e^{iuX_t}\right] =  \left(\frac{B(\alpha_t+i \sigma_t u, \beta_t- i \sigma u )}{B(\alpha_t, \beta_t)} \right)^{\delta_t} e^{ i \mu_t u}\;\;.$$

Two subcases of additive logistic process are the symmetric logistic additive process with standard logistic distribution ($\alpha_t=1$, $\beta_t=1$, $\delta_t=1$) and the conjugate-power Dagum additive process with Dagum distribution ($\alpha_t=1$, $\beta_t=1-\sigma(t)$, $\alpha_t=1$).

The function $\mu_t$ can always be chosen s.t. the additive process is a martingale.

=== Additive Normal Tempered Stable Process ===
Extension of the Lévy normal tempered stable processes; some well-known Lévy normal tempered stable processes have normal-inverse Gaussian distribution and the variance-gamma distribution. Additive normal tempered stable processes have the same characteristic function of Lévy normal tempered stable processes but with time dependent parameters $\sigma_t$ (the level of the volatility), $k_t$ (the variance of jumps) and $\eta_t$ (linked to the skew):

$$\operatorname E \left[e^{iuX_t}\right] = {\cal L}_t \left(iu \left(\frac{1}{2}+\eta_t \right)\sigma_t^2+\frac{u^2\sigma^2_t}{2};\;k_t,\;\alpha \right)e^{iu\varphi_tt},$$

where

$$\ln {\cal L}_t \left(u;\;k_t,\;\alpha\right) :=
\begin{cases}
\displaystyle \frac{t}{k_t}
\displaystyle \frac{1-\alpha}{\alpha}
\left \{1-		\left(1+\frac{u \; k_t}{1-\alpha}\right)^\alpha \right \} & \mbox{if } \; 0< \alpha < 1 \\[4mm]
\displaystyle -\frac{t}{k_t}
\ln \left(1+u \; k_t\right)  & \mbox{if } \; \alpha = 0 \end{cases}$$

The function $\varphi_t$ can always be chosen s.t. the additive process is a martingale.

=== Additive Subordinator ===
A positive non decreasing additive process $\{S_t\}_{t \geq 0}$ with values in $\mathbb R$ is an additive subordinator. An additive subordinator is a semimartingale (thanks to the fact that it is not decreasing) and it is always possible to rewrite its Laplace transform as

$\operatorname E\left[ e^{-u S_t} \right] = \exp\left(u b_t + \int_{\mathbb R^d} (e^{i u x}-1) \nu_t(dx)\right).$

It is possible to use additive subordinator to time-change a Lévy process obtaining a new class of additive processes.

=== Sato Process ===
An additive self-similar process $\{Z_t\}_{t \geq 0}$ is called Sato process. It is possible to construct a Sato process from a Lévy process $\{X_t\}_{t \geq 0}$ such that $Z_t$ has the same law of $t^hX_1$.

An example is the variance gamma SSD, the Sato process obtained starting from the variance gamma process.

The characteristic function of the Variance gamma at time $t=1$ is

$$\operatorname E \left[e^{iuX_1}\right] = \left(\frac{1}{1-iu\theta\nu+0.5\sigma^2\nu u^2}\right)^{1/\nu},$$

where $\theta, \nu$ and $\sigma$ are positive constant.

The characteristic function of the variance gamma SSD is

$\operatorname E \left[e^{iuZ_t}\right] = \left(\frac{1}{1-iut^h\theta\nu+0.5\sigma^2\nu u^2t^2h}\right)^{1/\nu}$

== Simulation ==
Simulation of Additive process is computationally efficient thanks to the independence of increments. The additive process increments can be simulated separately and simulation can also be parallelized.

=== Jump simulation ===
Jump simulation is a generalization to the class of additive processes of the jump simulation technique developed for Lévy processes. The method is based on truncating small jumps below a certain threshold and simulating the finite number of independent jumps. Moreover, Gaussian approximation can be applied to replace small jumps with a diffusive term. It is also possible to use the Ziggurat algorithm to speed up the simulation of jumps.

=== Characteristic function inversion ===
Simulation of Lévy process via characteristic function inversion is a well established technique in the literature. This technique can be extended to additive processes. The key idea is obtaining an approximation of the cumulative distribution function (CDF) by inverting the characteristic function. The inversion speed is enhanced by the use of the Fast Fourier transform. Once the approximation of the CDF is available is it possible to simulate an additive process increment just by simulating a uniform random variable. The method has similar computational cost as simulating a standard geometric Brownian motion.

== Applications ==
=== Quantitative finance ===
Lévy process is used to model the log-returns of market prices. Unfortunately, the stationarity of the increments does not reproduce correctly market data. A Lévy process fit well call option and put option prices (implied volatility) for a single expiration date but is unable to fit options prices with different maturities (volatility surface). The additive process introduces a deterministic non-stationarity that allows it to fit all expiration dates.

A four-parameters Sato process (self-similar additive process) can reproduce correctly the volatility surface (3% error on the S&P 500 equity market). This order of magnitude of error is usually obtained using models with 6-10 parameters to fit market data. A self-similar process correctly describes market data because of its flat skewness and excess kurtosis; empirical studies had observed this behavior in market skewness and excess kurtosis. Some of the processes that fit option prices with a 3% error are VGSSD, NIGSSD, MXNRSSD obtained from variance gamma process, normal inverse Gaussian process and Meixner process.

Additive normal tempered stable processes fit accurately equity market data ( error below 0.8% on the S&P 500 equity market) specifically for short maturities. These family of processes reproduces very well also the equity market implied volatility skew. Moreover, an interesting power scaling characteristic arises in calibrated parameters $k_t=\bar{k}t^\beta$ and $\eta_t=\bar{\eta}t^\delta$. There is statistical evidence that $\beta=1$ and $\delta=-1/2$.

Lévy subordination is used to construct new Lévy processes (for example variance gamma process and normal inverse Gaussian process). There is a large number of financial applications of processes constructed by Lévy subordination. An additive process built via additive subordination maintains the analytical tractability of a process built via Lévy subordination but it reflects better the time-inhomogeneus structure of market data. Additive subordination is applied to the commodity market and to VIX options.

=== Digital image processing ===
An estimator based on the minimum of an additive process can be applied to image processing. Such estimator aims to distinguish between real signal and noise in the picture pixels.

== Sources ==
- Tankov, Peter; Cont, Rama (2003). Financial modelling with jump processes. Chapman and Hall. ISBN 1584884134.
- Sato, Ken-Ito (1999). Lévy processes and infinitely divisible distributions. Cambridge University Press. ISBN 9780521553025.
- Li, Jing; Li, Lingfei; Mendoza-Arriaga, Rafael (2016). "Additive subordination and its applications in finance". Finance and Stochastics. 20 (3): 2–6. doi:10.1007/s00780-016-0300-8. S2CID 254078941.
- Carr, Peter; Torricelli, Lorenzo (2021). "Additive logistic processes in option pricing". Finance and Stochastics. 25 (3). arXiv:1909.07139. doi:10.1080/14697688.2021.1983200. S2CID 202577472.
- Azzone, Michele; Baviera, Roberto (2022). "Additive normal tempered stable processes for equity derivatives and power-law scaling". Quantitative Finance. 22. doi:10.1007/s00780-021-00461-8. hdl:11585/851693. S2CID 234657892.
- Azzone, Michele; Baviera, Roberto (2023). "A fast Monte Carlo scheme for additive processes and option pricing". Computational Management Science. 20 (1) 31. arXiv:2112.08291. doi:10.1007/s10287-023-00463-1. hdl:11311/1242978.
- Eberlein, Ernst; Madan, Dilip B. (2009). "Sato processes and the valuation of structured products". Quantitative Finance. 9 (1): 27–42. doi:10.1080/14697680701861419. S2CID 16991478.
- Ballotta, Laura; Kyriakou, Ioannis (2014). "Monte Carlo simulation of the CGMY process and option pricing" (PDF). Journal of Futures Markets. 34 (12): 1095–1121. doi:10.1002/fut.21647.
- Carr, Peter; Geman, Hélyette; Madan, Dilip B.; Yor, Marc (2007). "Self-Decomposability and Option Pricing". Mathematical Finance. 17 (1): 31–57. doi:10.1111/j.1467-9965.2007.00293.x. S2CID 452963.
- Li, Jing; Li, Lingfei; Zhang, Gongqiu (2017). "Pure jump models for pricing and hedging VIX derivatives". Journal of Economic Dynamics and Control. 74: 28–55. doi:10.1016/j.jedc.2016.11.001.
- Bhattacharya, P. K.; Brockwell, P. J. (1976). "The minimum of an additive process with applications to signal estimation and storage theory". Zeitschrift für Wahrscheinlichkeitstheorie und Verwandte Gebiete. 37 (1): 51–75. doi:10.1007/BF00536298. S2CID 121247350.
