= Continuity in probability =

In probability theory, a stochastic process is said to be continuous in probability or stochastically continuous if its distributions converge whenever the values in the index set converge.

== Definition ==
Let $X=(X_t)_{t \in T}$ be a stochastic process in $\R^n$. The process $X$ is continuous in probability when $X_r$ converges in probability to $X_s$ whenever $r$ converges to $s$.

== Examples and Applications ==
Feller processes are continuous in probability at $t=0$. Continuity in probability is a sometimes used as one of the defining property for Lévy process. Any process that is continuous in probability and has independent increments has a version that is càdlàg. As a result, some authors immediately define Lévy process as being càdlàg and having independent increments.
