= Markov additive process =

In applied probability, a Markov additive process (MAP) is a bivariate Markov process where the future states depends only on one of the variables.

== Definition ==
=== Finite or countable state space for J(t) ===
The process $\{ (X(t), J(t)) : t\ge 0 \}$ is a Markov additive process with continuous time parameter t if

1. $\{ (X(t), J(t)) ; t\ge 0 \}$ is a Markov process
2. the conditional distribution of $(X(t+s)-X(t), J(t+s))$ given $(X(t), J(t))$ depends only on $J(t)$.

The state space of the process is R × S where X(t) takes real values and J(t) takes values in some countable set S.

=== General state space for J(t) ===
For the case where J(t) takes a more general state space the evolution of X(t) is governed by J(t) in the sense that for any f and g we require

$$\mathbb E[f(X_{t+s}-X_t)g(J_{t+s})|\mathcal F_t] = \mathbb E_{J_t,0}[f(X_s)g(J_s)]$$.

== Example ==
A fluid queue is a Markov additive process where J(t) is a continuous-time Markov chain.

== Applications ==
Çinlar uses the unique structure of the MAP to prove that, given a gamma process with a shape parameter that is a function of Brownian motion, the resulting lifetime is distributed according to the Weibull distribution.

Kharoufeh presents a compact transform expression for the failure distribution for wear processes of a component degrading according to a Markovian environment inducing state-dependent continuous linear wear by using the properties of a MAP and assuming the wear process to be temporally homogeneous and that the environmental process has a finite state space.
