= Isotropic measure =

Mathematical measure invariant under linear isometries

In probability theory, an isotropic measure is any mathematical measure that is invariant under linear isometries. It is a standard simplification and assumption used in probability theory. Generally, it is used in the context of measure theory on $n$-dimensional Euclidean space, for which it can be intuitive to study measures that are unchanged by rotations and translations. An obvious example of such a measure is the standard way of assigning a measure to subsets of n-dimensional Euclidean space: Lebesgue measure.

== Definition ==
An isotropic measure on $\mathbb{R}^{d}$ is a (Borel) measure that is absolutely continuous on $\mathbb {R}^d \smallsetminus \{ 0 \}$ and that is invariant under linear isometries of $\mathbb{R}^{d}$. Alternatively, an isotropic measure, $\mu(dz)$, is a measure for which there exists a real density function $\mu_{0}(r)$ on $(0,\infty)$ such that $\mu(dz) = \mu_{0}\left( |z| \right)dz$ for $z \neq 0$.

== Example ==
- The Lebesgue measure on $\mathbb{R}^{d}$ is invariant under linear isometries and is hence an isotropic measure. In this case, $\mu(dz) = dz$.
- For $d=1$, the linear isometries of $\mathbb{R}^{1}$ are of the form $f(x) = x + c$ or $f(x) = -x + c$, for some constant $c \in \mathbb{R}$. Hence an isotropic measure on $\mathbb{R}^{1}$ must satisfy $\mu(A) = \mu(-A + b)$, for any $A \subseteq \mathbb{R}^{1}$ and $b \in \mathbb{R}$. The measure $\mu(dz) = |z|^{-2} dz$, for $z \neq 0$, is one such isotropic measure.

== Unimodal measure ==
In probability theory it is common that another assumption is added to measures in addition to the measure being isotropic. A unimodal measure (or isotropic unimodal measure) is any isotropic measure $\mu(dz) = \mu_{0}\left( |z| \right)dz$ such that $\mu_{0}(r)$ is nonincreasing on $(0,\infty)$. It is possible that $\mu\left( \left\{ 0 \right\} \right)>0$.

== Isotropic and unimodal stochastic processes ==
In studying stochastic processes, in particular Lévy processes, a reasonable assumption to make is that, for each element of the index set, the probability distributions of the random variables are isotropic or even unimodal measures.

More specifically, an isotropic Lévy process is a Lévy process, $X = \left( X_t, t \geq 0 \right)$, such that all its distributions, $p_{t} (dx)$, are isotropic measures. A unimodal Lévy process (or isotropic unimodal Lévy process) is a Lévy process, $X = \left( X_t, t \geq 0 \right)$, such that all its distributions, $p_{t} (dx)$, are unimodal measures.

== See also ==
- Measure (mathematics)
- Stochastic process
- Lévy process
