= Combinant =

Mathematical theory

In the mathematical theory of probability, the combinants c_{n} of a random variable X are defined via the combinant-generating function G(t), which is defined from the moment generating function M(z) as

$$G_X(t)=M_X(\log(1+t))$$

which can be expressed directly in terms of a random variable X as

$$G_X(t) := E\left[(1+t)^X\right], \quad t \in \mathbb{R},$$

wherever this expectation exists.

The nth combinant can be obtained as the nth derivatives of the logarithm of combinant generating function evaluated at –1 divided by n factorial:

$$c_n = \frac{1}{n!} \frac{\partial ^n}{\partial t^n} \log(G (t)) \bigg|_{t=-1}$$

Important features in common with the cumulants are:

- the combinants share the additivity property of the cumulants;
- for infinite divisibility (probability) distributions, both sets of moments are strictly positive.
