= Cauchy process =

Type of stochastic process in probability

In probability theory, a Cauchy process is a type of stochastic process. There are symmetric and asymmetric forms of the Cauchy process. The unspecified term "Cauchy process" is often used to refer to the symmetric Cauchy process.

The Cauchy process has a number of properties:

1. It is a Lévy process
2. It is a stable process
3. It is a pure jump process
4. Its moments are infinite.

== Symmetric Cauchy process ==
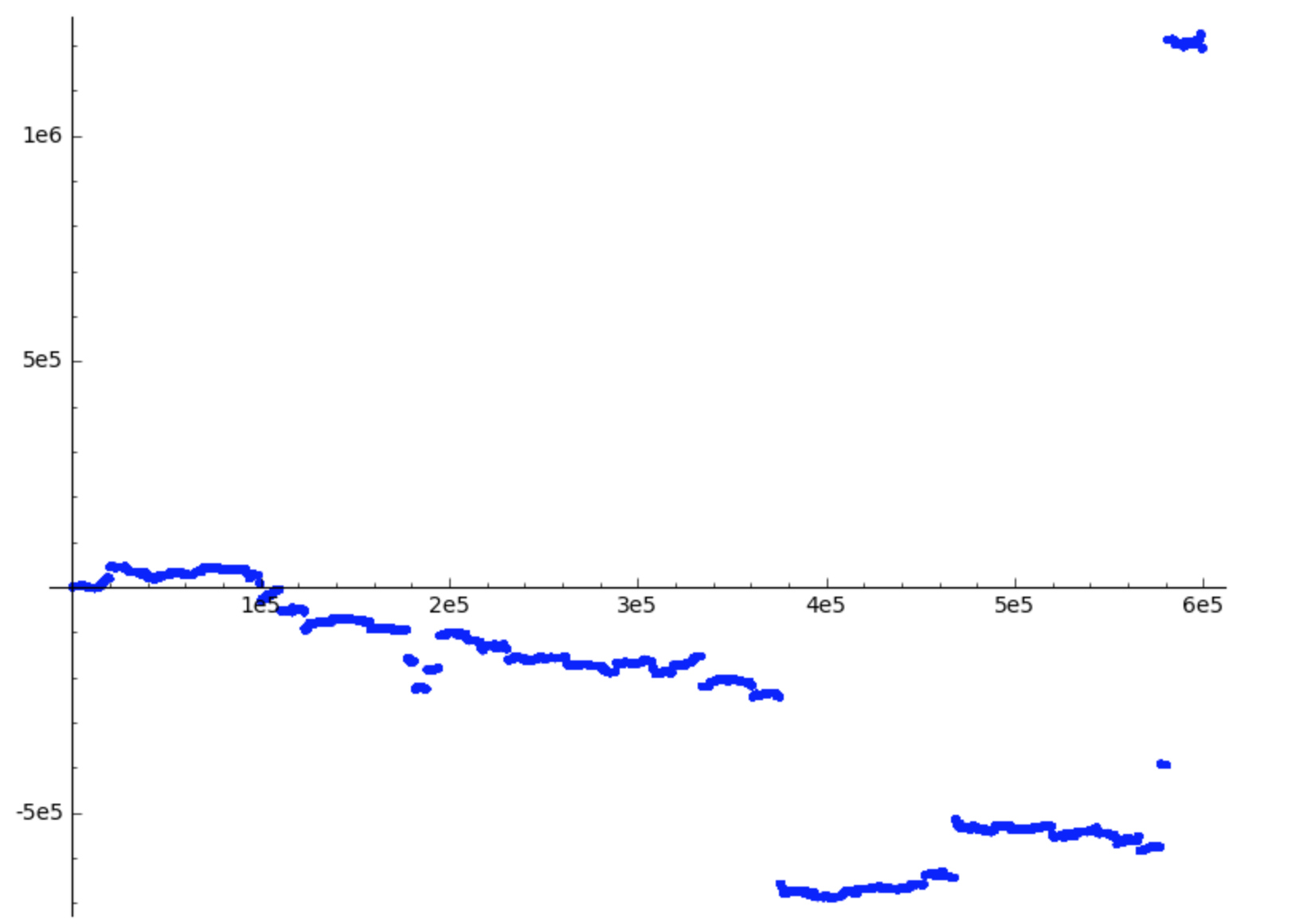

The symmetric Cauchy process can be described by a Brownian motion or Wiener process subject to a Lévy subordinator. The Lévy subordinator is a process associated with a Lévy distribution having location parameter of $0$ and a scale parameter of $t^2/2$. The Lévy distribution is a special case of the inverse-gamma distribution. So, using $C$ to represent the Cauchy process and $L$ to represent the Lévy subordinator, the symmetric Cauchy process can be described as:

$$C(t; 0, 1) \;:=\;W(L(t; 0, t^2/2)).$$

The Lévy distribution is the probability of the first hitting time for a Brownian motion, and thus the Cauchy process is essentially the result of two independent Brownian motion processes.

The Lévy–Khintchine representation for the symmetric Cauchy process is a triplet with zero drift and zero diffusion, giving a Lévy–Khintchine triplet of $(0,0, W)$, where $W(dx) = dx / (\pi x^2)$.

The marginal characteristic function of the symmetric Cauchy process has the form:

$$\operatorname{E}\Big[e^{i\theta X_t} \Big] =  e^{-t |\theta |}.$$

The marginal probability distribution of the symmetric Cauchy process is the Cauchy distribution whose density is

$$f(x; t) = { 1 \over \pi } \left[ { t \over x^2 + t^2  } \right].$$

== Asymmetric Cauchy process ==
The asymmetric Cauchy process is defined in terms of a parameter $\beta$. Here $\beta$ is the skewness parameter, and its absolute value must be less than or equal to 1. In the case where $|\beta|=1$ the process is considered a completely asymmetric Cauchy process.

The Lévy–Khintchine triplet has the form $(0,0, W)$, where
$$W(dx) = \begin{cases} Ax^{-2}\,dx & \text{if } x>0 \\ Bx^{-2}\,dx & \text{if } x<0 \end{cases}$$
, where $A \ne B$, $A>0$ and $B>0$.

Given this, $\beta$ is a function of $A$ and $B$.

The characteristic function of the asymmetric Cauchy distribution has the form:

$$\operatorname{E}\Big[e^{i\theta X_t} \Big] =  e^{-t (|\theta | + i \beta \theta \ln|\theta| / (2 \pi))}.$$

The marginal probability distribution of the asymmetric Cauchy process is a stable distribution with index of stability (i.e., α parameter) equal to 1.
