= Gamma process =

Stochastic process for effort or wear

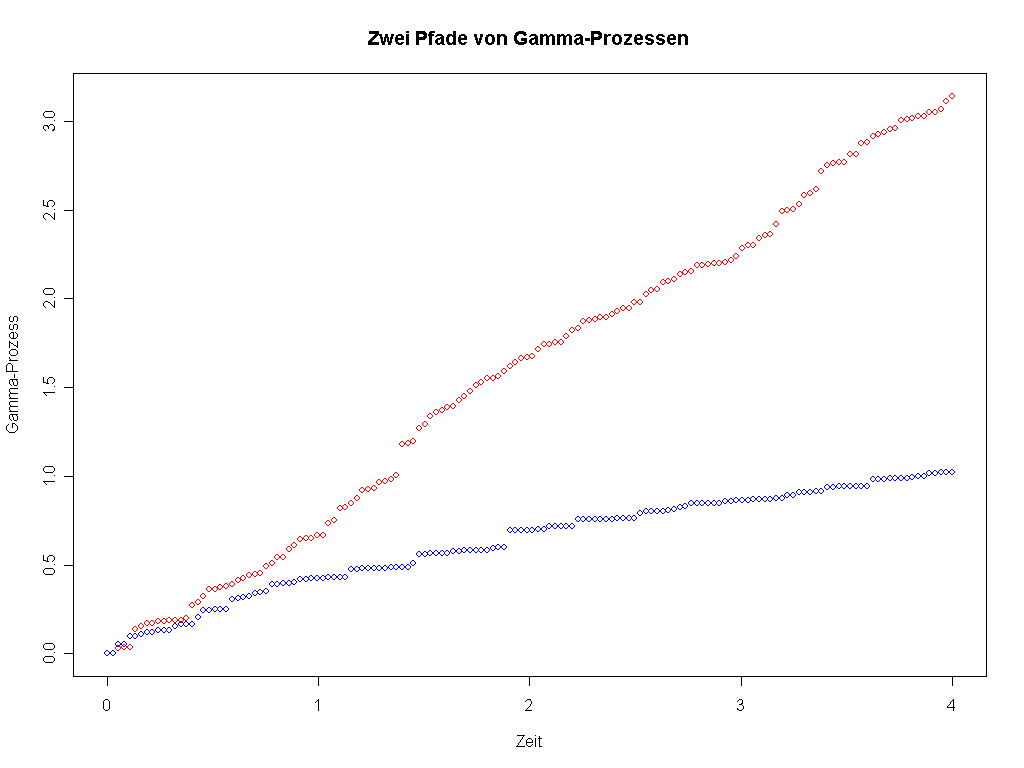
Two different gamma processes from time 0 until time 4. The red process has more occurrences in the timeframe compared to the blue process because its shape parameter is larger than the blue shape parameter.

A gamma process, also called the Moran-Gamma subordinator, is a two-parameter stochastic process which models the accumulation of effort or wear over time. The gamma process has independent and stationary increments which follow the gamma distribution, hence the name. The gamma process is studied in mathematics, statistics, probability theory, and stochastics, with particular applications in deterioration modeling and mathematical finance.

== Notation ==
The gamma process is often abbreviated as $X(t)\equiv\Gamma(t;\gamma, \lambda)$ where $t$ represents the time from 0. The shape parameter $\gamma$ (inversely) controls the jump size, and the rate parameter $\lambda$ controls the rate of jump arrivals, analogously with the gamma distribution. Both $\gamma$ and $\lambda$ must be greater than 0. We use the gamma function and gamma distribution in this article, so the reader should distinguish between $\Gamma(\cdot)$ (the gamma function), $\Gamma(\gamma, \lambda)$ (the gamma distribution), and $\Gamma(t;\gamma, \lambda)$ (the gamma process).

== Definition ==
The process is a pure-jump increasing Lévy process with intensity measure $\nu(x)=\gamma x^{-1} \exp(-\lambda x),$ for all positive $x$. It is assumed that the process starts from a value 0 at $t=0$ meaning $X(0)=0$. Thus jumps whose size lies in the interval $[x,x+dx)$ occur as a Poisson process with intensity $\nu(x)\,dx.$

The process can also be defined as a stochastic process $X(t), t \leq 0$ with $X(0) = 0$ and independent increments, whose marginal distribution $f$ of the random variable $X(t) - X(s)$ for an increment $l = t-s \geq 0$ is given by
$$f(x;l, \gamma, \lambda) = \Gamma(\gamma l, \lambda) = \frac {\lambda^{\gamma l}}{\Gamma (\gamma l)} x^{\gamma l-1}e^{-\lambda x}.$$

=== Inhomogenous process ===
It is also possible to allow the shape parameter $\gamma$ to vary as a function of time, $\gamma(t)$.

== Properties ==
=== Mean and variance ===
Because the value at each time $t$ has mean $\gamma t/\lambda$ and variance $\gamma t/\lambda^2,$ the gamma process is sometimes also parameterised in terms of the mean ($\mu$) and variance ($v$) of the increase per unit time. These satisfy $\gamma = \mu^2/v$ and $\lambda = \mu/v$.

=== Scaling ===
Multiplication of a gamma process by a scalar constant $\alpha$ is again a gamma process with different mean increase rate.
$$\alpha\Gamma(t;\gamma,\lambda) \simeq \Gamma(t;\gamma,\lambda/\alpha)$$

=== Adding independent processes ===
The sum of two independent gamma processes is again a gamma process.
$$\Gamma(t;\gamma_1,\lambda) + \Gamma(t;\gamma_2,\lambda) \simeq \Gamma(t;\gamma_1+\gamma_2,\lambda)$$

=== Moments ===
The moment function helps mathematicians find expected values, variances, skewness, and kurtosis.
$$\operatorname E(X_t^n) = \lambda^{-n} \cdot \frac{\Gamma(\gamma t+n)}{\Gamma(\gamma t)},\ \quad n\geq 0 ,$$
where $\Gamma(z)$ is the Gamma function.

=== Moment generating function ===
The moment generating function is the expected value of $\exp(tX)$ where X is the random variable.
$$\operatorname E\Big(\exp(\theta X_t)\Big) = \left(1- \frac\theta\lambda\right)^{-\gamma t},\  \quad \theta<\lambda$$

=== Correlation ===
Correlation displays the statistical relationship between any two gamma processes.
$$\operatorname{Corr}(X_s, X_t) = \sqrt{\frac s t},\ s<t$$
, for any gamma process $X(t) .$

== Related processes ==
The gamma process is used as the distribution for random time change in the variance gamma process. Specifically, combining Brownian motion with a gamma process produces a variance gamma process, and a variance gamma process can be written as the difference of two gamma processes.

== See also ==
- Moran process
