= Generalized Poisson distribution on a locally compact Abelian group =

Generalized Poisson distribution on a locally compact Abelian group, along with the Gaussian distribution, plays an important role in the arithmetic of probability distributions.

Let $X$ be a locally compact Abelian group, let $Y$ be its character group, and let $(x, y)$ be the value of a character $y \in Y$ at an element $x \in X$. Let $F$ be a finite non-negative measure on $X$. The generalized Poisson distribution associated with the measure $F$ is defined as a shift of the distribution $e(F)$ of the form

$e(F)=\exp\{-F(X)\}\left(E_0+F+\frac{F^{*2}}{2!}+\dots +\frac{F^{*n}}{n!}+\dots\right),$

where $E_0$ is the degenerate distribution concentrated at the zero of the group $X$.

The distribution $e(F)$ is infinitely divisible. The characteristic function of the distribution $e(F)$ has the form

$\widehat{e(F)}(y)=\exp\left\{\int_X[(x, y)-1]\,dF(x)\right\}.$

Decompositions of generalized Poisson distributions were studied in and, see also. In particular, the following theorem holds.

Theorem. Let $X$ be a locally compact Abelian group, and let $F$ be a finite non-negative measure on $X$. If the measures $F^{*m}$ and $F^{*n}$ are mutually singular for all natural $m \ne n$, then all factors of the generalized Poisson distribution $\mu=e(F)$ are also generalized Poisson distributions, i.e., $\mu$ has no indecomposable factors.
