= Kolmogorov extension theorem =

Consistent set of finite-dimensional distributions will define a stochastic process

In mathematics, the Kolmogorov extension theorem (also known as Kolmogorov existence theorem, the Kolmogorov consistency theorem or the Daniell-Kolmogorov theorem) is a theorem that guarantees that a suitably "consistent" collection of finite-dimensional distributions will define a stochastic process. It is credited to the English mathematician Percy John Daniell and the Russian mathematician Andrey Nikolaevich Kolmogorov.

== Statement of the theorem ==
Let $T$ denote some interval (thought of as "time"), and let $n \in \mathbb{N}$. For each $k \in \mathbb{N}$ and finite sequence of distinct times $t_{1}, \dots, t_{k} \in T$, let $\nu_{t_{1} \dots t_{k}}$ be a probability measure on $(\mathbb{R}^{n})^{k}.$ Suppose that these measures satisfy two consistency conditions:

1. for all permutations $\pi$ of $\{ 1, \dots, k \}$ and measurable sets $F_{i} \subseteq \mathbb{R}^{n}$,

$$\nu_{t_{\pi (1)} \dots t_{\pi (k)}} \left( F_{\pi (1)} \times \dots \times F_{ \pi(k)} \right) = \nu_{t_{1} \dots t_{k}} \left( F_{1} \times \dots \times F_{k} \right);$$

2. for all measurable sets $F_{i} \subseteq \mathbb{R}^{n}$,$m \in \mathbb{N}$

$$\nu_{t_{1} \dots t_{k}} \left( F_{1} \times \dots \times F_{k} \right) = \nu_{t_{1} \dots t_{k}, t_{k + 1}, \dots , t_{k+m}} \left( F_{1} \times \dots \times F_{k} \times \underbrace{\mathbb{R}^{n} \times \dots \times \mathbb{R}^{n}}_{m}  \right).$$

Then there exists a probability space $(\Omega, \mathcal{F}, \mathbb{P})$ and a stochastic process $X : T \times \Omega \to \mathbb{R}^{n}$ such that

$$\nu_{t_{1} \dots t_{k}} \left( F_{1} \times \dots \times F_{k} \right) = \mathbb{P} \left( X_{t_{1}} \in F_{1}, \dots, X_{t_{k}} \in F_{k} \right)$$

for all $t_{i} \in T$, $k \in \mathbb{N}$ and measurable sets $F_{i} \subseteq \mathbb{R}^{n}$, i.e. $X$ has $\nu_{t_{1} \dots t_{k}}$ as its finite-dimensional distributions relative to times $t_{1} \dots t_{k}$.

In fact, it is always possible to take as the underlying probability space $\Omega = (\mathbb{R}^n)^T$ and to take for $X$ the canonical process $X\colon (t,Y) \mapsto Y_t$. Therefore, an alternative way of stating Kolmogorov's extension theorem is that, provided that the above consistency conditions hold, there exists a (unique) measure $\nu$ on $(\mathbb{R}^n)^T$ with marginals $\nu_{t_{1} \dots t_{k}}$ for any finite collection of times $t_{1} \dots t_{k}$. Kolmogorov's extension theorem applies when $T$ is uncountable, but the price to pay for this level of generality is that the measure $\nu$ is only defined on the product σ-algebra of $(\mathbb{R}^n)^T$, which is not very rich.

== Explanation of the conditions ==
The two conditions required by the theorem are trivially satisfied by any stochastic process. For example, consider a real-valued discrete-time stochastic process $X$. Then the probability $\mathbb{P}(X_1 >0, X_2<0)$ can be computed either as $\nu_{1,2}( \mathbb{R}_+ \times \mathbb{R}_-)$ or as $\nu_{2,1}( \mathbb{R}_- \times \mathbb{R}_+)$. Hence, for the finite-dimensional distributions to be consistent, it must hold that $\nu_{1,2}( \mathbb{R}_+ \times \mathbb{R}_-) = \nu_{2,1}( \mathbb{R}_- \times \mathbb{R}_+)$. The first condition generalizes this statement to hold for any number of time points $t_i$, and any control sets $F_i$.

Continuing the example, the second condition implies that $\mathbb{P}(X_1>0) = \mathbb{P}(X_1>0, X_2 \in \mathbb{R})$. Also this is a trivial condition that will be satisfied by any consistent family of finite-dimensional distributions.

== Implications of the theorem ==
Since the two conditions are trivially satisfied for any stochastic process, the power of the theorem is that no other conditions are required: For any reasonable (i.e., consistent) family of finite-dimensional distributions, there exists a stochastic process with these distributions.

The measure-theoretic approach to stochastic processes starts with a probability space and defines a stochastic process as a family of functions on this probability space. However, in many applications the starting point is really the finite-dimensional distributions of the stochastic process. The theorem says that provided the finite-dimensional distributions satisfy the obvious consistency requirements, one can always identify a probability space to match the purpose. In many situations, this means that one does not have to be explicit about what the probability space is. Many texts on stochastic processes do, indeed, assume a probability space but never state explicitly what it is.

The theorem is used in one of the standard proofs of existence of a Brownian motion, by specifying the finite dimensional distributions to be Gaussian random variables, satisfying the consistency conditions above. As in most of the definitions of Brownian motion it is required that the sample paths are continuous almost surely, and one then uses the Kolmogorov continuity theorem to construct a continuous modification of the process constructed by the Kolmogorov extension theorem.

== General form of the theorem ==
The Kolmogorov extension theorem gives us conditions for a collection of measures on Euclidean spaces to be the finite-dimensional distributions of some $\mathbb{R}^{n}$-valued stochastic process, but the assumption that the state space be $\mathbb{R}^{n}$ is unnecessary. In fact, any collection of measurable spaces together with a collection of inner regular measures defined on the finite products of these spaces would suffice, provided that these measures satisfy a certain compatibility relation. The formal statement of the general theorem is as follows.

Let $T$ be any set. Let $\{ (\Omega_t, \mathcal{F}_t) \}_{t \in T}$ be some collection of measurable spaces, and for each $t \in T$, let $\tau_t$ be a Hausdorff topology on $\Omega_t$. For each finite subset $J \subset T$, define

$$\Omega_J := \prod_{t\in J} \Omega_t$$.

For subsets $I \subset J \subset T$, let $\pi^J_I: \Omega_J \to \Omega_I$ denote the canonical projection map $\omega \mapsto \omega|_I$.

For each finite subset $F \subset T$, suppose we have a probability measure $\mu_F$ on $\Omega_F$ which is inner regular with respect to the product topology (induced by the $\tau_t$) on $\Omega_F$. Suppose also that this collection $\{\mu_F\}$ of measures satisfies the following compatibility relation: for finite subsets $F \subset G \subset T$, we have that

$$\mu_F = (\pi^G_F)_* \mu_G$$

where $(\pi^G_F)_* \mu_G$ denotes the pushforward measure of $\mu_G$ induced by the canonical projection map $\pi^G_F$.

Then there exists a unique probability measure $\mu$ on $\Omega_T$ such that $\mu_F=(\pi^T_F)_* \mu$ for every finite subset $F \subset T$.

As a remark, all of the measures $\mu_F,\mu$ are defined on the product sigma algebra on their respective spaces, which (as mentioned before) is rather coarse. The measure $\mu$ may sometimes be extended appropriately to a larger sigma algebra, if there is additional structure involved.

Note that the original statement of the theorem is just a special case of this theorem with $\Omega_t = \mathbb{R}^n$ for all $t \in T$, and $\mu_{\{t_1,...,t_k\}}=\nu_{t_1 \dots t_k}$ for $t_1,...,t_k \in T$. The stochastic process would simply be the canonical process $(\pi_t)_{t \in T}$, defined on $\Omega=(\mathbb{R}^n)^T$ with probability measure $P=\mu$. The reason that the original statement of the theorem does not mention inner regularity of the measures $\nu_{t_1\dots t_k}$ is that this would automatically follow, since Borel probability measures on Polish spaces are automatically Radon.

This theorem has many far-reaching consequences; for example it can be used to prove the existence of the following, among others:

- Brownian motion, i.e., the Wiener process,
- a Markov chain taking values in a given state space with a given transition matrix,
- infinite products of (inner-regular) probability spaces.

== History ==
According to John Aldrich, the theorem was independently discovered by British mathematician Percy John Daniell in the slightly different setting of integration theory.
