= 2-EPT probability density function =

2-EPT Density Function
- Parameters: $(\textbf{A}_N,\textbf{b}_N,\textbf{c}_N,\textbf{A}_P,\textbf{b}_P,\textbf{c}_P)$ $\mathfrak{Re}(\sigma(\textbf{A}_P))<0$ $\mathfrak{Re}(\sigma(\textbf{A}_N))>0$
- Support: $x \in (-\infty; +\infty)\!$
- PDF: $$f(x) = \left\{\begin{matrix} \textbf{c}_Ne^{\textbf{A}_Nx}\textbf{b}_N & \text{if }x < 0 \\[8pt] \textbf{c}_Pe^{\textbf{A}_Px}\textbf{b}_P & \text{if }x \geq 0 \end{matrix}\right.$$
- CDF: $$F(x) = \left\{\begin{matrix} \textbf{c}_N\textbf{A}_N^{-1}e^{\textbf{A}_Nx}\textbf{b}_N & \text{if }x < 0 \\[8pt] 1 + \textbf{c}_P\textbf{A}_P^{-1}e^{\textbf{A}_Px}\textbf{b}_P & \text{if }x \geq 0 \end{matrix}\right.$$
- Mean: $-\textbf{c}_N(-\textbf{A}_N)^{-2}\textbf{b}_N + \textbf{c}_P(-\textbf{A}_P)^{-2}\textbf{b}_P$
- CF: $-\textbf{c}_N(Iiu-\textbf{A}_N)^{-1}\textbf{b}_N+\textbf{c}_P(Iiu-\textbf{A}_P)^{-1}\textbf{b}_P$

In probability theory, a 2-EPT probability density function is a class of probability density functions on the real line. The class contains the density functions of all distributions that have characteristic functions that are strictly proper rational functions (i.e., the degree of the numerator is strictly less than the degree of the denominator).

== Definition ==
A 2-EPT probability density function is a probability density function on $\mathbb{R}$ with a strictly proper rational characteristic function. On either $[0, +\infty)$ or $(-\infty, 0)$ these probability density functions are exponential-polynomial-trigonometric (EPT) functions.

Any EPT density function on $(-\infty, 0)$ can be represented as

$$f(x)=\textbf{c}_Ne^{\textbf{A}_Nx}\textbf{b}_N ,$$

where e represents a matrix exponential, $(\textbf{A}_N,\textbf{A}_P)$ are square matrices, $(\textbf{b}_N,\textbf{b}_P)$ are column vectors and $(\textbf{c}_N,\textbf{c}_P)$ are row vectors. Similarly the EPT density function on $[0, -\infty)$ is expressed as

$$f(x)=\textbf{c}_Pe^{\textbf{A}_Px}\textbf{b}_P.$$

The parameterization $(\textbf{A}_N,\textbf{b}_N,\textbf{c}_N,\textbf{A}_P,\textbf{b}_P,\textbf{c}_P)$ is the minimal realization of the 2-EPT function.

The general class of probability measures on $\mathbb{R}$ with (proper) rational characteristic functions are densities corresponding to mixtures of the pointmass at zero ("delta distribution") and 2-EPT densities. Unlike phase-type and matrix geometric distributions, the 2-EPT probability density functions are defined on the whole real line. It has been shown that the class of 2-EPT densities is closed under many operations and using minimal realizations these calculations have been illustrated for the two-sided framework in Sexton and Hanzon. The most involved operation is the convolution of 2-EPT densities using state space techniques. Much of the work centers on the ability to decompose the rational characteristic function into the sum of two rational functions with poles located in either the open left or open right half plane. The variance-gamma distribution density has been shown to be a 2-EPT density under a parameter restriction.
