= Lévy distribution =

Probability distribution

Lévy (unshifted)
- Probability density function

- Cumulative distribution function
- Parameters: $\mu$ location; $c > 0\,$ scale
- Support: $x \in (\mu, \infty)$
- PDF: $\sqrt{\frac{c}{2\pi}}~~\frac{e^{-\frac{c}{2(x-\mu)}}}{(x-\mu)^{3/2}}$
- CDF: $\textrm{erfc}\left(\sqrt{\frac{c}{2(x-\mu)}}\right)$
- Quantile: $\mu+\frac{\sigma}{2\left(\textrm{erfc}^{-1}(p)\right)^2}$
- Mean: $\infty$
- Median: $\mu+c/2(\textrm{erfc}^{-1}(1/2))^2\,$
- Mode: $\mu + \frac{c}{3}$
- Variance: $\infty$
- Skewness: undefined
- Excess kurtosis: undefined
- Entropy: $\frac{1+3\gamma+\ln(16\pi c^2)}{2}$ where $\gamma$ is the Euler-Mascheroni constant
- MGF: undefined
- CF: $e^{i\mu t-\sqrt{-2ict}}$

In probability theory and statistics, the Lévy distribution, named after Paul Lévy, is a continuous probability distribution for a non-negative random variable. In spectroscopy, this distribution, with frequency as the dependent variable, is known as a van der Waals profile. (Note: "van der Waals profile" appears with lowercase "van" in almost all sources, such as: Statistical mechanics of the liquid surface by Clive Anthony Croxton, 1980, A Wiley-Interscience publication, ISBN 0-471-27663-4, ISBN 978-0-471-27663-0, ; and in Journal of technical physics, Volume 36, by Instytut Podstawowych Problemów Techniki (Polska Akademia Nauk), publisher: Państwowe Wydawn. Naukowe., 1995,) It is a special case of the inverse-gamma distribution and a stable distribution.

== Definition ==
The probability density function of the Lévy distribution over the domain $x \ge \mu$ is

$$f(x; \mu, c) = \sqrt{\frac{c}{2\pi}} \, \frac{e^{-\frac{c}{2(x - \mu)}}}{(x - \mu)^{3/2}},$$

where $\mu$ is the location parameter and $c$ is the scale parameter. The cumulative distribution function is

$$F(x; \mu, c) = \operatorname{erfc}\left(\sqrt{\frac{c}{2(x - \mu)}}\right) = 2 - 2 \Phi\left({\sqrt{\frac{c}{(x - \mu)}}}\right),$$

where $\operatorname{erfc}(z)$ is the complementary error function, and $\Phi(x)$ is the Laplace function (CDF of the standard normal distribution). The shift parameter $\mu$ has the effect of shifting the curve to the right by an amount $\mu$ and changing the support to the interval [$\mu$, $\infty$). Like all stable distributions, the Lévy distribution has a standard form f(x; 0, 1) which has the following property:

$$f(x; \mu, c) \,dx = f(y; 0, 1) \,dy,$$

where y is defined as

$$y = \frac{x - \mu}{c}.$$

The characteristic function of the Lévy distribution is given by

$$\varphi(t; \mu, c) = e^{i\mu t - \sqrt{-2ict}}.$$

Note that the characteristic function can also be written in the same form used for the stable distribution with $\alpha = 1/2$ and $\beta = 1$:

$$\varphi(t; \mu, c) = e^{i\mu t - |ct|^{1/2} (1 - i\operatorname{sign}(t))}.$$

Assuming $\mu = 0$, the nth moment of the unshifted Lévy distribution is formally defined by

$$m_n\ \stackrel{\text{def}}{=}\ \sqrt{\frac{c}{2\pi}} \int_0^\infty \frac{e^{-c/2x} x^n}{x^{3/2}} \,dx,$$

which diverges for all $n \geq 1/2$, so that the integer moments of the Lévy distribution do not exist (only some fractional moments).

The moment-generating function would be formally defined by

$$M(t; c)\ \stackrel{\mathrm{def}}{=}\ \sqrt{\frac{c}{2\pi}} \int_0^\infty \frac{e^{-c/2x + tx}}{x^{3/2}} \,dx,$$

however, this diverges for $t > 0$ and is therefore not defined on an interval around zero, so the moment-generating function is actually undefined.

Like all stable distributions except the normal distribution, the wing of the probability density function exhibits heavy tail behavior falling off according to a power law:

$$f(x; \mu, c) \sim \sqrt{\frac{c}{2\pi}} \, \frac{1}{x^{3/2}}$$
as $x \to \infty,$

which shows that the Lévy distribution is not just heavy-tailed but also fat-tailed. This is illustrated in the diagram below, in which the probability density functions for various values of c and $\mu = 0$ are plotted on a log–log plot:

Probability density function for the Lévy distribution on a log–log plot

The standard Lévy distribution satisfies the condition of being stable:

$$(X_1 + X_2 + \dotsb + X_n) \sim n^{1/\alpha}X,$$

where $X_1, X_2, \ldots, X_n, X$ are independent standard Lévy-variables with $\alpha = 1/2.$

== Related distributions ==
- If $X \sim \operatorname{Levy}(\mu, c)$, then $kX + b \sim \operatorname{Levy}(k\mu + b, kc).$
- If $X \sim \operatorname{Levy}(0, c)$, then $X \sim \operatorname{Inv-Gamma}(1/2, c/2)$ (inverse gamma distribution). Here, the Lévy distribution is a special case of a Pearson type V distribution.
- If $Y \sim \operatorname{Normal}(\mu, \sigma^2)$ (normal distribution), then $(Y - \mu)^{-2} \sim \operatorname{Levy}(0, 1/\sigma^2).$
- If $Y \sim \operatorname{Normal}(\mu, 1/c)$, then $(Y - \mu)^{-2} \sim \operatorname{Levy}(0, c)$.
- If $X \sim \operatorname{Levy}(\mu, c)$, then $X \sim \operatorname{Stable}(1/2, 1, c, \mu)$ (stable distribution).
- If $X \sim \operatorname{Levy}(0, c)$, then $X\,\sim\,\operatorname{Scale-inv-\chi^2}(1, c)$ (scaled-inverse-chi-squared distribution).
- If $X \sim \operatorname{Levy}(\mu, c)$, then $(X - \mu)^{-1/2} \sim \operatorname{FoldedNormal}(0, 1/\sqrt{c})$ (folded normal distribution).

== Random-sample generation ==
Random samples from the Lévy distribution can be generated using inverse transform sampling. Given a random variate U drawn from the uniform distribution on the unit interval (0, 1], the variate X given by

$$X = F^{-1}(U) = \frac{c}{(\Phi^{-1}(1 - U/2))^2} + \mu$$

is Lévy-distributed with location $\mu$ and scale $c$. Here $\Phi(x)$ is the cumulative distribution function of the standard normal distribution.

== Applications ==
- The frequency of geomagnetic reversals appears to follow a Lévy distribution
- The time of hitting a single point, at distance $\alpha$ from the starting point, by the Brownian motion has the Lévy distribution with $c=\alpha^2$. (For a Brownian motion with drift, this time may follow an inverse Gaussian distribution, which has the Lévy distribution as a limit.)
- The length of the path followed by a photon in a turbid medium follows the Lévy distribution.
- A Cauchy process can be defined as a Brownian motion subordinated to a process associated with a Lévy distribution.
