= Variance-gamma distribution =

Continuous probability distribution

variance-gamma distribution
- Parameters: $\mu$ location (real) $\alpha$ (real) $\beta$ asymmetry parameter (real) $\lambda > 0$ shape parameter (alternative parameterizations use $\nu=1/\lambda$) $\gamma = \sqrt{\alpha^2 - \beta^2} > 0$
- Support: $x \in (-\infty; +\infty)\!$
- PDF: $\frac{\gamma^{2\lambda} | x - \mu|^{\lambda-1/2} K_{\lambda-1/2} {\left(\alpha|x - \mu|\right)}}{\sqrt{\pi} \Gamma (\lambda)(2 \alpha)^{\lambda-1/2}} \; e^{\beta (x - \mu)}$ $K_\lambda$ denotes a modified Bessel function of the second kind $\Gamma$ denotes the Gamma function
- Mean: $\mu + 2 \beta \lambda/ \gamma^2$
- Variance: $\frac{2\lambda}{\gamma^2}(1 + 2 \beta^2/\gamma^2)$
- MGF: $e^{\mu z} \left[\frac{\gamma^2}{\alpha^2 -(\beta+z)^2}\right]^{\lambda}$

The variance-gamma distribution, generalized Laplace distribution or Bessel function distribution is a continuous probability distribution that is defined as the normal variance-mean mixture where the mixing density is the gamma distribution. The tails of the distribution decrease more slowly than the normal distribution. It is therefore suitable to model phenomena where numerically large values are more probable than is the case for the normal distribution. Examples are returns from financial assets and turbulent wind speeds. The distribution was introduced in the financial literature by Madan and Seneta. The variance-gamma distributions form a subclass of the generalised hyperbolic distributions.

The fact that there is a simple expression for the moment generating function implies that simple expressions for all moments are available. The class of variance-gamma distributions is closed under convolution in the following sense. If $X_1$ and $X_2$ are independent random variables that are variance-gamma distributed with the same values of the parameters $\alpha$ and $\beta$, but possibly different values of the other parameters, $\lambda_1$, $\mu_1$ and $\lambda_2,$ $\mu_2$, respectively, then $X_1 + X_2$ is variance-gamma distributed with parameters $\alpha$, $\beta$, $\lambda_1+\lambda_2$ and $\mu_1 + \mu_2$.

The variance-gamma distribution can also be expressed in terms of three inputs parameters (C,G,M) denoted after the initials of its founders. If the "C", $\lambda$ here, parameter is integer then the distribution has a closed form 2-EPT distribution. See 2-EPT probability density function. Under this restriction closed form option prices can be derived.

If $\alpha=1$, $\lambda=1$ and $\beta=0$, the distribution becomes a Laplace distribution with scale parameter $b=1$. As long as $\lambda=1$, alternative choices of $\alpha$ and $\beta$ will produce distributions related to the Laplace distribution, with skewness, scale and location depending on the other parameters.

For a symmetric variance-gamma distribution, the kurtosis can be given by $3(1 + 1/\lambda)$.

See also Variance gamma process.
