= Percy John Daniell =

British mathematician

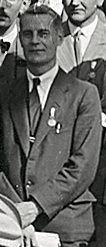
- Daniell at the ICM 1932, Zürich
- Born: Percy John Daniell; January 9, 1889; Valparaíso, Chile
- Died: May 25, 1946 (aged 57); Sheffield, United Kingdom
- Known for: Daniell integral
- Scientific career
- Fields: Applied mathematics Mathematical analysis Theoretical physics
- Institutions: University of Liverpool; Rice University; University of Göttingen; University of Sheffield

Percy John Daniell (9 January 1889 – 25 May 1946) was a pure and applied mathematician.

== Early life and education ==
Daniell was born in Valparaíso, Chile. His family returned to England in 1895. Daniell attended King Edward's School, Birmingham and proceeded to Trinity College, Cambridge (where he was the last Senior Wrangler in 1909). At this time Daniell was an applied mathematician/theoretical physicist.

== Mathematical career ==
For a year he lectured at the University of Liverpool and then he was appointed to the new Rice Institute in Houston, Texas. The Rice Institute had him spend a year at the University of Göttingen studying with Max Born and David Hilbert. Daniell was at Rice from 1914 to 1923 when he returned to England to a chair at the University of Sheffield.

In a series of papers published between 1918 and 1928, he developed and expanded a generalized theory of integration and differentiation, which is today known as the Daniell integral. In the setting of integration, he also worked on results that lead to the Daniell-Kolmogorov extension theorem in the theory of stochastic processes, independently of Andrey Kolmogorov. He was an Invited Speaker of the ICM in 1920 at Strasbourg.

== Death ==
During World War II Daniell advised the British Ministry of Supply. The strain of work during the war took a heavy toll on his health. He died on 25 May 1946, after having collapsed at his home a few weeks earlier.
