= Lévy process =

Stochastic process in probability theory

In probability theory, a Lévy process, named after the French mathematician Paul Lévy, is a stochastic process with independent, stationary increments: it represents the motion of a point whose successive displacements are random, in which displacements in pairwise disjoint time intervals are independent, and displacements in different time intervals of the same length have identical probability distributions. A Lévy process may thus be viewed as the continuous-time analog of a random walk.

The most well known examples of Lévy processes are the Wiener process, often called the Brownian motion process, and the Poisson process. Further important examples include the Gamma process, the Pascal process, and the Meixner process. Aside from Brownian motion with drift, all other proper (that is, not deterministic) Lévy processes have discontinuous paths. All Lévy processes are additive processes.

== Mathematical definition ==
A Lévy process is a stochastic process $X=\{X_t:t \geq 0\}$ that satisfies the following properties:

1. $X_0=0 \,$ almost surely;
2. Independence of increments: For any $0 \leq t_1 < t_2<\cdots <t_n <\infty$, $X_{t_2}-X_{t_1}, X_{t_3}-X_{t_2},\dots,X_{t_n}-X_{t_{n-1}}$ are mutually independent;
3. Stationary increments: For any $s<t \,$, $X_t-X_s \,$ is equal in distribution to $X_{t-s}; \,$
4. Continuity in probability: For any $\varepsilon>0$ and $t\ge 0$ it holds that $\lim_{h\rightarrow 0} P(|X_{t+h}-X_t|>\varepsilon)=0.$

If $X$ is a Lévy process then one may construct a version of $X$ such that $t \mapsto X_t$ is almost surely right-continuous with left limits.

== Properties ==
=== Independent increments ===
A continuous-time stochastic process assigns a random variable X_{t} to each point t ≥ 0 in time. In effect it is a random function of t. The increments of such a process are the differences X_{s} − X_{t} between its values at different times t < s. To call the increments of a process independent means that increments X_{s} − X_{t} and X_{u} − X_{v} are independent random variables whenever the two time intervals do not overlap and, more generally, any finite number of increments assigned to pairwise non-overlapping time intervals are mutually (not just pairwise) independent.

=== Stationary increments ===
To call the increments stationary means that the probability distribution of any increment X_{t} − X_{s} depends only on the length t − s of the time interval; increments on equally long time intervals are identically distributed.

If $X$ is a Wiener process, the probability distribution of X_{t} − X_{s} is normal with expected value 0 and variance t − s.

If $X$ is a Poisson process, the probability distribution of X_{t} − X_{s} is a Poisson distribution with expected value λ(t − s), where λ > 0 is the "intensity" or "rate" of the process.

If $X$ is a Cauchy process, the probability distribution of X_{t} − X_{s} is a Cauchy distribution with density $f(x; t) = { 1 \over \pi } \left[ { \gamma \over x^2 + \gamma^2 } \right]$ where $\gamma=t-s$.

=== Infinite divisibility ===
The distribution of a Lévy process has the property of infinite divisibility: given any integer n, the law of a Lévy process at time t can be represented as the law of the sum of n independent random variables, which are precisely the increments of the Lévy process over time intervals of length t/n, which are independent and identically distributed by assumptions 2 and 3. Conversely, for each infinitely divisible probability distribution $F$, there is a Lévy process $X$ such that the law of $X_1$ is given by $F$.

=== Moments ===
In any Lévy process with finite moments, the nth moment $\mu_n(t) = E(X_t^n)$, is a polynomial function of t; these functions satisfy a binomial identity:

$$\mu_n(t+s)=\sum_{k=0}^n {n \choose k} \mu_k(t) \mu_{n-k}(s).$$

== Lévy–Khintchine representation ==
The distribution of a Lévy process is characterized by its characteristic function, which is given by the Lévy–Khintchine formula (general for all infinitely divisible distributions):

If $X = (X_t)_{t\geq 0}$ is a Lévy process, then its characteristic function $\varphi_X(\theta)$ is given by

$$\varphi_X(\theta)(t) := \mathbb{E}\left[e^{i\theta X(t)}\right] = \exp{\left(t\left(ai\theta - \frac{1}{2}\sigma^2\theta^2 + \int_{\R\setminus\{0\}}{\left(e^{i\theta x}-1 -i\theta x\mathbf{1}_{|x|<1}\right)\,\Pi(dx)}\right)\right)}$$

where $a \in \mathbb{R}$, $\sigma\ge 0$, and $\Pi$ is a σ-finite measure called the Lévy measure of $X$, satisfying the property

$$\int_{\R\setminus\{0\}}{\min(1,x^2)\,\Pi(dx)} < \infty.$$

In the above, $\mathbf{1}$ is the indicator function. Because characteristic functions uniquely determine their underlying probability distributions, each Lévy process is uniquely determined by the "Lévy–Khintchine triplet" $(a,\sigma^2, \Pi)$. The terms of this triplet suggest that a Lévy process can be seen as having three independent components: a linear drift, a Brownian motion, and a Lévy jump process, as described below. This immediately gives that the only (nondeterministic) continuous Lévy process is a Brownian motion with drift; similarly, every Lévy process is a semimartingale.

=== Lévy–Itô decomposition ===
Because the characteristic functions of independent random variables multiply, the Lévy–Khintchine theorem suggests that every Lévy process is the sum of Brownian motion with drift and another independent random variable, a Lévy jump process. The Lévy–Itô decomposition describes the latter as a (stochastic) sum of independent Poisson random variables.

Let $\nu=\frac{\Pi|_{\R\setminus(-1,1)}}{\Pi(\R\setminus(-1,1))}$— that is, the restriction of $\Pi$ to $\R\setminus(-1,1)$, normalized to be a probability measure; similarly, let $\mu=\Pi|_{(-1,1)\setminus\{0\}}$ (but do not rescale). Then

$$\int_{\R\setminus\{0\}}{\left(e^{i\theta x}-1 -i\theta x\mathbf{1}_{|x|<1}\right)\,\Pi(dx)}=\Pi(\R\setminus(-1,1))\int_{\R}{(e^{i\theta x}-1)\,\nu(dx)}+\int_{\R}{(e^{i\theta x}-1-i\theta x)\,\mu(dx)}.$$

The former is the characteristic function of a compound Poisson process with intensity $\Pi(\R\setminus(-1,1))$ and child distribution $\nu$. The latter is that of a compensated generalized Poisson process (CGPP): a process with countably many jump discontinuities on every interval a.s., but such that those discontinuities are of magnitude less than $1$. If $\int_{\R}{|x|\,\mu(dx)}<\infty$, then the CGPP is a pure jump process. Therefore, in terms of processes one may decompose $X$ in the following way

$$X_t=\sigma B_t + at+Y_t+Z_t, t\geq 0,$$

where $Y$ is the compound Poisson process with jumps larger than $1$ in absolute value and $Z_t$ is the aforementioned compensated generalized Poisson process which is also a zero-mean martingale.

== Generalization ==
A Lévy random field is a multi-dimensional generalization of Lévy process. Still more general are decomposable processes.

== See also ==
- Independent and identically distributed random variables
- Wiener process
- Poisson process
- Gamma process
- Markov process
- Lévy flight
- Jump diffusion
