= Independent increments =

In probability theory, independent increments are a property of stochastic processes and random measures. Most of the time, a process or random measure has independent increments by definition, which underlines their importance. Some of the stochastic processes that by definition possess independent increments are the Wiener process, all Lévy processes, all additive process, and the Poisson point process.

== Definition for stochastic processes ==
Let $(X_t)_{t \in T}$ be a stochastic process. In most cases, $T= \N$ or $T=\R^+$. Then the stochastic process has independent increments if and only if for every $m \in \N$ and any choice $t_0, t_1, t_2, \dots,t_{m-1}, t_m \in T$ with

$$t_0 < t_1 < t_2< \dots < t_m$$

the random variables

$$(X_{t_1}-X_{t_0}),(X_{t_2}-X_{t_1}), \dots, (X_{t_m}-X_{t_{m-1}} )$$

are stochastically independent.

== Definition for random measures ==
A random measure $\xi$ has got independent increments if and only if the random variables $\xi(B_1), \xi(B_2), \dots, \xi(B_m)$ are stochastically independent for every selection of pairwise disjoint measurable sets $B_1, B_2, \dots, B_m$ and every $m \in \N$.

== Independent S-increments ==
Let $\xi$ be a random measure on $S \times T$ and define for every bounded measurable set $B$ the random measure $\xi_B$ on $T$ as

$$\xi_B(\cdot):= \xi(B \times \cdot )$$

Then $\xi$ is called a random measure with independent S-increments, if for all bounded sets $B_1, B_2, \dots, B_n$ and all $n \in \N$ the random measures $\xi_{B_1},\xi_{B_2}, \dots, \xi_{B_n}$ are independent.

== Application ==
Independent increments are a basic property of many stochastic processes and are often incorporated in their definition. The notion of independent increments and independent S-increments of random measures plays an important role in the characterization of Poisson point process and infinite divisibility.
