= Absorbing set (random dynamical systems) =

In the mathematical theory of random dynamical systems, an absorbing set is a subset of the phase space that exhibits a capturing property. It acts like a gravitational center, with the property that all trajectories of the system eventually enter and remain within that set.

Absorbing sets ultimately contain the transformed images of any initially bounded set as the system evolves over time. As with many concepts related to random dynamical systems, it is defined in the pullback sense, which means they are understood through their long-term behavior.

Absorbing sets are a key concept in the study of the long-term behavior of dynamical systems, particularly in the context of dissipative systems, as they provide a bound on the possible future states of the system. The existence and properties of absorbing sets are fundamental to establishing the existence of global attractors and understanding the asymptotic behavior of solutions.

== Definition ==
Consider a random dynamical system φ on a complete separable metric space (X, d), where the noise is chosen from a probability space (Ω, Σ, P) with base flow θ : R × Ω → Ω. A random compact set K : Ω → 2^{X} is said to be absorbing if, for all d-bounded deterministic sets B ⊆ X, there exists a (finite) random time τ_{B} : Ω → 0, +∞) such that

$$t \geq \tau_{B} (\omega) \implies \varphi (t, \theta_{-t} \omega) B \subseteq K(\omega).$$

This is a definition in the pullback sense, as indicated by the use of the negative time shift θ_{−t}.

== See also ==
- Glossary of areas of mathematics
- Lists of mathematics topics
- Mathematics Subject Classification
- Outline of mathematics
