= Base flow =

The term base flow may refer to:

- Baseflow in hydrology
- Base flow (random dynamical systems) in the study of random dynamical systems in mathematics
