= Random closed set =

Type of random variable

In mathematics, particularly in probability theory and stochastic geometry, a random closed set is a random variable whose values are closed subsets of a given topological space, typically Euclidean space $\mathbb{R}^n$. Random closed sets generalize the concept of random variables and random processes by allowing entire sets, rather than individual points or vectors, to be treated as random elements. They are widely used in areas such as spatial statistics, image analysis, materials science, and mathematical morphology.

== Definition ==
A random closed set in $\mathbb{R}^d$ is a measurable function from a probability space $(\Omega,\mathcal{A}, P)$ into $(\mathcal{F}, \Sigma)$. Here $\mathcal{F}$ is the collection of all closed subsets of $\mathbb{R}^d$ and $\Sigma$ is the sigma-algebra generated over $\mathcal{F}$ by the sets
$$\mathcal{F}_K=\{F\in\mathcal{F}:F\cap K=\emptyset\}$$
for all compact subsets $K\subset\mathbb{R}^d$.

== History ==
Mentions of random sets have appeared for almost a century beginning with A.N. Kolmogorov's book, Foundations of the Theory of Probability, which provided the axiomatic foundation for probability theory. In this book, Kolmogorov defined what is now referred to as a random set. Up until the 1960s, mentions of random sets could be found scattered throughout publications before Gustave Choquet formalized the concept of a random set. French mathematician Georges Matheron is recognized as the first person to concentrate on random sets with closed values and formulate a definition.

== See also ==
- random compact set
