= Pullback attractor =

In mathematics, the attractor of a random dynamical system may be loosely thought of as a set to which the system evolves after a long enough time. The basic idea is the same as for a deterministic dynamical system, but requires careful treatment because random dynamical systems are necessarily non-autonomous. This requires one to consider the notion of a pullback attractor or attractor in the pullback sense.

== Set-up and motivation ==
Consider a random dynamical system $\varphi$ on a complete separable metric space $(X, d)$, where the noise is chosen from a probability space $(\Omega, \mathcal{F}, \mathbb{P})$ with base flow $\vartheta : \mathbb{R} \times \Omega \to \Omega$.

A naïve definition of an attractor $\mathcal{A}$ for this random dynamical system would be to require that for any initial condition $x_{0} \in X$, $\varphi(t, \omega) x_{0} \to \mathcal{A}$ as $t \to + \infty$. This definition is far too limited, especially in dimensions higher than one. A more plausible definition, modelled on the idea of an omega-limit set, would be to say that a point $a \in X$ lies in the attractor $\mathcal{A}$ if and only if there exists an initial condition, $x_{0} \in X$, and there is a sequence of times $t_{n} \to + \infty$ such that

$d \left( \varphi(t_{n}, \omega) x_{0}, a \right) \to 0$ as $n \to \infty$.

This is not too far from a working definition. However, we have not yet considered the effect of the noise $\omega$, which makes the system non-autonomous (i.e. it depends explicitly on time). For technical reasons, it becomes necessary to do the following: instead of looking $t$ seconds into the "future", and considering the limit as $t \to + \infty$, one "rewinds" the noise $t$ seconds into the "past", and evolves the system through $t$ seconds using the same initial condition. That is, one is interested in the pullback limit

$$\lim_{t \to + \infty} \varphi (t, \vartheta_{-t} \omega)$$.

So, for example, in the pullback sense, the omega-limit set for a (possibly random) set $B(\omega) \subseteq X$ is the random set

$$\Omega_{B} (\omega) := \left\{ x \in X \left| \exists t_{n} \to + \infty, \exists b_{n} \in B(\vartheta_{-t_{n}} \omega) \mathrm{\,s.t.\,} \varphi (t_{n}, \vartheta_{-t_{n}} \omega) b_{n} \to x \mathrm{\,as\,} n \to \infty \right. \right\}.$$

Equivalently, this may be written as

$$\Omega_{B} (\omega) = \bigcap_{t \geq 0} \overline{\bigcup_{s \geq t} \varphi (s, \vartheta_{-s} \omega) B(\vartheta_{-s} \omega)}.$$

Importantly, in the case of a deterministic dynamical system (one without noise), the pullback limit coincides with the deterministic forward limit, so it is meaningful to compare deterministic and random omega-limit sets, attractors, and so forth.

Several examples of pullback attractors of non-autonomous dynamical systems are presented analytically and numerically.

== Definition ==
The pullback attractor (or random global attractor) $\mathcal{A} (\omega)$ for a random dynamical system is a $\mathbb{P}$-almost surely unique random set such that

1. $\mathcal{A} (\omega)$ is a random compact set: $\mathcal{A} (\omega) \subseteq X$ is almost surely compact and $\omega \mapsto \mathrm{dist} (x, \mathcal{A} (\omega))$ is a $(\mathcal{F}, \mathcal{B}(X))$-measurable function for every $x \in X$;
2. $\mathcal{A} (\omega)$ is invariant: for all $\varphi (t, \omega) ( \mathcal{A} (\omega) ) = \mathcal{A} (\vartheta_{t} \omega)$ almost surely;
3. $\mathcal{A} (\omega)$ is attractive: for any deterministic bounded set $B \subseteq X$,

$\lim_{t \to + \infty} \mathrm{dist} \left( \varphi (t, \vartheta_{-t} \omega) (B), \mathcal{A} (\omega) \right) = 0$ almost surely.

There is a slight abuse of notation in the above: the first use of "dist" refers to the Hausdorff semi-distance from a point to a set,

$$\mathrm{dist} (x, A) := \inf_{a \in A} d(x, a),$$

whereas the second use of "dist" refers to the Hausdorff semi-distance between two sets,

$$\mathrm{dist} (B, A) := \sup_{b \in B} \inf_{a \in A} d(b, a).$$

As noted in the previous section, in the absence of noise, this definition of attractor coincides with the deterministic definition of the attractor as the minimal compact invariant set that attracts all bounded deterministic sets.

== Theorems relating omega-limit sets to attractors ==
=== The attractor as a union of omega-limit sets ===
If a random dynamical system has a compact random absorbing set $K$, then the random global attractor is given by

$$\mathcal{A} (\omega) = \overline{\bigcup_{B} \Omega_{B} (\omega)},$$

where the union is taken over all bounded sets $B \subseteq X$.

=== Bounding the attractor within a deterministic set ===
Crauel (1999) proved that if the base flow $\vartheta$ is ergodic and $D \subseteq X$ is a deterministic compact set with

$$\mathbb{P} \left( \mathcal{A} (\cdot) \subseteq D \right) > 0,$$

then $\mathcal{A} (\omega) = \Omega_{D} (\omega)$ $\mathbb{P}$-almost surely.
