= Random compact set =

In mathematics, a random compact set is essentially a compact set-valued random variable. Random compact sets are useful in the study of attractors for random dynamical systems.

== Definition ==
Let $(M, d)$ be a complete separable metric space. Let $\mathcal{K}$ denote the set of all compact subsets of $M$. The Hausdorff metric $h$ on $\mathcal{K}$ is defined by

$$h(K_{1}, K_{2}) := \max \left\{ \sup_{a \in K_{1}} \inf_{b \in K_{2}} d(a, b), \sup_{b \in K_{2}} \inf_{a \in K_{1}} d(a, b) \right\}.$$

$(\mathcal{K}, h)$ is also а complete separable metric space. The corresponding open subsets generate a σ-algebra on $\mathcal{K}$, the Borel sigma algebra $\mathcal{B}(\mathcal{K})$ of $\mathcal{K}$.

A random compact set is а measurable function $K$ from а probability space $(\Omega, \mathcal{F}, \mathbb{P})$ into $(\mathcal{K}, \mathcal{B} (\mathcal{K}) )$.

Put another way, a random compact set is a measurable function $K \colon \Omega \to 2^{M}$ such that $K(\omega)$ is almost surely compact and

$$\omega \mapsto \inf_{b \in K(\omega)} d(x, b)$$

is a measurable function for every $x \in M$.

== Discussion ==
Random compact sets in this sense are also random closed sets as in Matheron (1975). Consequently, under the additional assumption that the carrier space is locally compact, their distribution is given by the probabilities

$\mathbb{P} (X \cap K = \emptyset)$ for $K \in \mathcal{K}.$

(The distribution of а random compact convex set is also given by the system of all inclusion probabilities $\mathbb{P}(X \subset K).$)

For $K = \{ x \}$, the probability $\mathbb{P} (x \in X)$ is obtained, which satisfies

$$\mathbb{P}(x \in X) = 1 - \mathbb{P}(x \not\in X).$$

Thus the covering function $p_{X}$ is given by

$p_{X} (x) = \mathbb{P} (x \in X)$ for $x \in M.$

Of course, $p_{X}$ can also be interpreted as the mean of the indicator function $\mathbf{1}_{X}$:

$$p_{X} (x) = \mathbb{E} \mathbf{1}_{X} (x).$$

The covering function takes values between $0$ and $1$. The set $b_{X}$ of all $x \in M$ with $p_{X} (x) > 0$ is called the support of $X$. The set $k_X$, of all $x \in M$ with $p_X(x)=1$ is called the kernel, the set of fixed points, or essential minimum $e(X)$. If $X_1, X_2, \ldots$, is а sequence of i.i.d. random compact sets, then almost surely

$$\bigcap_{i=1}^\infty X_i = e(X)$$

and $\bigcap_{i=1}^\infty X_i$ converges almost surely to $e(X).$
