= Random dynamical system =

Mathematical concept

In mathematics, a random dynamical system is a dynamical system in which the equations of motion have an element of randomness to them. Random dynamical systems are characterized by a state space S, a set of maps $\Gamma$ from S into itself that can be thought of as the set of all possible equations of motion, and a probability distribution Q on the set $\Gamma$ that represents the random choice of map. Motion in a random dynamical system can be informally thought of as a state $X \in S$ evolving according to a succession of maps randomly chosen according to the distribution Q.

An example of a random dynamical system is a stochastic differential equation; in this case the distribution Q is typically determined by noise terms. It consists of a base flow, the "noise", and a cocycle dynamical system on the "physical" phase space. Another example is discrete state random dynamical system; some elementary contradistinctions between Markov chain and random dynamical system descriptions of a stochastic dynamics are discussed.

== Motivation 1: Solutions to a stochastic differential equation ==
Let $f : \mathbb{R}^{d} \to \mathbb{R}^{d}$ be a $d$-dimensional vector field, and let $\varepsilon > 0$. Suppose that the solution $X(t, \omega; x_{0})$ to the stochastic differential equation

$$\left\{ \begin{matrix} \mathrm{d} X = f(X) \, \mathrm{d} t + \varepsilon \, \mathrm{d} W (t); \\ X (0) = x_{0}; \end{matrix} \right.$$

exists for all positive time and some (small) interval of negative time dependent upon $\omega \in \Omega$, where $W : \mathbb{R} \times \Omega \to \mathbb{R}^{d}$ denotes a $d$-dimensional Wiener process (Brownian motion). Implicitly, this statement uses the classical Wiener probability space

$$(\Omega, \mathcal{F}, \mathbb{P}) := \left( C_{0} (\mathbb{R}; \mathbb{R}^{d}), \mathcal{B} (C_{0} (\mathbb{R}; \mathbb{R}^{d})), \gamma \right).$$

In this context, the Wiener process is the coordinate process.

Now define a flow map or (solution operator) $\varphi : \mathbb{R} \times \Omega \times \mathbb{R}^{d} \to \mathbb{R}^{d}$ by

$$\varphi (t, \omega, x_{0}) := X(t, \omega; x_{0})$$

(whenever the right hand side is well-defined). Then $\varphi$ (or, more precisely, the pair $(\mathbb{R}^{d}, \varphi)$) is a (local, left-sided) random dynamical system. The process of generating a "flow" from the solution to a stochastic differential equation leads us to study suitably defined "flows" on their own. These "flows" are random dynamical systems.

== Motivation 2: Connection to Markov Chain ==
An i.i.d random dynamical system in the discrete space is described by a triplet $(S, \Gamma, Q)$.

- $S$ is the state space, $\{s_1, s_2,\cdots, s_n\}$.
- $\Gamma$ is a family of maps of $S\rightarrow S$. Each such map has a $n\times n$ matrix representation, called deterministic transition matrix. It is a binary matrix but it has exactly one entry 1 in each row and 0s otherwise.
- $Q$ is the probability measure of the $\sigma$-field of $\Gamma$.

The discrete random dynamical system comes as follows,

1. The system is in some state $x_0$ in $S$, a map $\alpha_1$ in $\Gamma$ is chosen according to the probability measure $Q$ and the system moves to the state $x_1=\alpha_1(x_0)$ in step 1.
2. Independently of previous maps, another map $\alpha_2$ is chosen according to the probability measure $Q$ and the system moves to the state $x_2=\alpha_2(x_1)$.
3. The procedure repeats.

The random variable $X_n$ is constructed by means of composition of independent random maps, $X_n=\alpha_n\circ \alpha_{n-1}\circ \dots \circ \alpha_1(X_0)$. Clearly, $X_n$ is a Markov Chain.

Reversely, can, and how, a given MC be represented by the compositions of i.i.d. random transformations? Yes, it can, but not unique. The proof for existence is similar with Birkhoff–von Neumann theorem for doubly stochastic matrix.

Here is an example that illustrates the existence and non-uniqueness.

Example: If the state space $S=\{1, 2\}$ and the set of the transformations $\Gamma$ expressed in terms of deterministic transition matrices. Then a Markov transition matrix$M =\left(\begin{array}{cc} 0.4 & 0.6 \\ 0.7 & 0.3 \end{array}\right)$ can be represented by the following decomposition by the min-max algorithm, $M =0.6\left(\begin{array}{cc} 0 & 1 \\ 1 & 0 \end{array}\right)+0.3 \left(\begin{array}{cc} 1 & 0 \\ 0 & 1 \end{array}\right)+ 0.1\left(\begin{array}{cc} 1 & 0 \\ 1 & 0 \end{array}\right).$

In the meantime, another decomposition could be $M = 0.18 \left(\begin{array}{cc} 0 & 1 \\ 0 & 1 \end{array}\right)+ 0.28\left(\begin{array}{cc} 1 & 0 \\ 1 & 0 \end{array}\right) +0.42\left(\begin{array}{cc} 0 & 1 \\ 1 & 0 \end{array}\right)+0.12\left(\begin{array}{cc} 1 & 0 \\ 0 & 1 \end{array}\right).$

== Formal definition ==
Formally, a random dynamical system consists of a base flow, the "noise", and a cocycle dynamical system on the "physical" phase space. In detail.

Let $(\Omega, \mathcal{F}, \mathbb{P})$ be a probability space, the noise space. Define the base flow $\vartheta : \mathbb{R} \times \Omega \to \Omega$ as follows: for each "time" $s \in \mathbb{R}$, let $\vartheta_{s} : \Omega \to \Omega$ be a measure-preserving measurable function:

$\mathbb{P} (E) = \mathbb{P} (\vartheta_{s}^{-1} (E))$ for all $E \in \mathcal{F}$ and $s \in \mathbb{R}$;

Suppose also that

1. $\vartheta_{0} = \mathrm{id}_{\Omega} : \Omega \to \Omega$, the identity function on $\Omega$;
2. for all $s, t \in \mathbb{R}$, $\vartheta_{s} \circ \vartheta_{t} = \vartheta_{s + t}$.

That is, $\vartheta_{s}$, $s \in \mathbb{R}$, forms a group of measure-preserving transformation of the noise $(\Omega, \mathcal{F}, \mathbb{P})$. For one-sided random dynamical systems, one would consider only positive indices $s$; for discrete-time random dynamical systems, one would consider only integer-valued $s$; in these cases, the maps $\vartheta_{s}$ would only form a commutative monoid instead of a group.

While true in most applications, it is not usually part of the formal definition of a random dynamical system to require that the measure-preserving dynamical system $(\Omega, \mathcal{F}, \mathbb{P}, \vartheta)$ is ergodic.

Now let $(X, d)$ be a complete separable metric space, the phase space. Let $\varphi : \mathbb{R} \times \Omega \times X \to X$ be a $(\mathcal{B} (\mathbb{R}) \otimes \mathcal{F} \otimes \mathcal{B} (X), \mathcal{B} (X))$-measurable function such that

1. for all $\omega \in \Omega$, $\varphi (0, \omega) = \mathrm{id}_{X} : X \to X$, the identity function on $X$;
2. for (almost) all $\omega \in \Omega$, $(t,x) \mapsto \varphi (t, \omega,x)$ is continuous;
3. $\varphi$ satisfies the (crude) cocycle property: for almost all $\omega \in \Omega$,

$$\varphi (t, \vartheta_{s} (\omega)) \circ \varphi (s, \omega) = \varphi (t + s, \omega).$$

In the case of random dynamical systems driven by a Wiener process $W : \mathbb{R} \times \Omega \to X$, the base flow $\vartheta_{s} : \Omega \to \Omega$ would be given by

$$W (t, \vartheta_{s} (\omega)) = W (t + s, \omega) - W(s, \omega)$$.

This can be read as saying that $\vartheta_{s}$ "starts the noise at time $s$ instead of time 0". Thus, the cocycle property can be read as saying that evolving the initial condition $x_{0}$ with some noise $\omega$ for $s$ seconds and then through $t$ seconds with the same noise (as started from the $s$ seconds mark) gives the same result as evolving $x_{0}$ through $(t + s)$ seconds with that same noise.

== Attractors for random dynamical systems ==
The notion of an attractor for a random dynamical system is not as straightforward to define as in the deterministic case. It is necessary to "rewind time", as in the definition of a pullback attractor, so that the noise close to the final time remains consistent. Moreover, the attractor is dependent upon the realisation $\omega$ of the noise.

== See also ==
- Chaos theory
- Diffusion process
- Stochastic control
