= Wrapped Cauchy distribution =

Wrapped probability distribution

Wrapped Cauchy
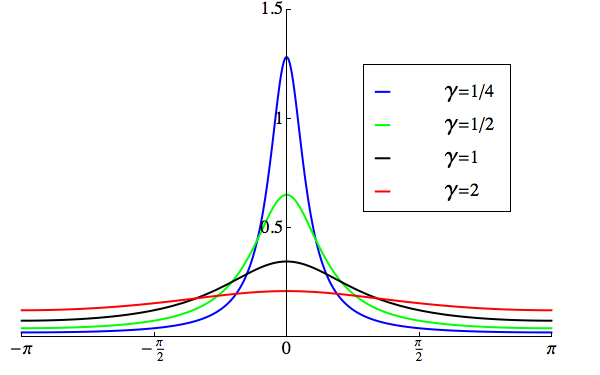
- Probability density function The support is chosen to be [-π,π)

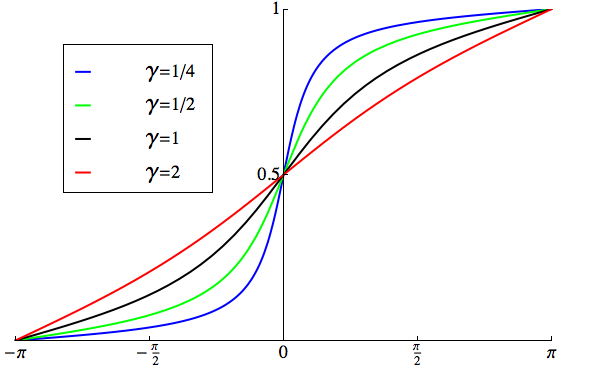
- Cumulative distribution function The support is chosen to be [-π,π)
- Parameters: $\mu$ Real $\gamma>0$
- Support: $-\pi\le\theta<\pi$
- PDF: $\frac{1}{2\pi}\,\frac{\sinh(\gamma)}{\cosh(\gamma)-\cos(\theta-\mu)}$
- CDF: $\,$
- Mean: $\mu$ (circular)
- Variance: $1-e^{-\gamma}$ (circular)
- Entropy: $\ln(2\pi(1-e^{-2\gamma}))$ (differential)
- CF: $e^{in\mu-|n|\gamma}$

In probability theory and directional statistics, a wrapped Cauchy distribution is a wrapped probability distribution that results from the "wrapping" of the Cauchy distribution around the unit circle. The Cauchy distribution is sometimes known as a Lorentzian distribution, and the wrapped Cauchy distribution may sometimes be referred to as a wrapped Lorentzian distribution.

The wrapped Cauchy distribution is often found in the field of spectroscopy where it is used to analyze diffraction patterns (e.g. see Fabry–Pérot interferometer).

== Description ==
The probability density function of the wrapped Cauchy distribution is:

$$f_\text{WC}(\theta;\mu,\gamma)=\sum_{n=-\infty}^\infty \frac{\gamma}{\pi(\gamma^2+(\theta-\mu+2\pi n)^2)}\qquad -\pi<\theta<\pi$$

where $\gamma$ is the scale factor and $\mu$ is the peak position of the "unwrapped" distribution. Expressing the above pdf in terms of the characteristic function of the Cauchy distribution yields:

$$f_\text{WC}(\theta;\mu,\gamma)=\frac{1}{2\pi}\sum_{n=-\infty}^\infty e^{in(\theta-\mu)-|n|\gamma} =\frac{1}{2\pi}\,\,\frac{\sinh\gamma}{\cosh\gamma-\cos(\theta-\mu)}$$

The PDF may also be expressed in terms of the circular variable z = e^{iθ} and the complex parameter ζ = e^{i(μ+iγ)}

$$f_\text{WC}(z;\zeta)=\frac{1}{2\pi}\,\,\frac{1-|\zeta|^2}{|z-\zeta|^2}$$

where, as shown below, ζ = ⟨z⟩.

In terms of the circular variable $z=e^{i\theta}$ the circular moments of the wrapped Cauchy distribution are the characteristic function of the Cauchy distribution evaluated at integer arguments:

$$\langle z^n\rangle=\int_\Gamma e^{in\theta}\,f_\text{WC}(\theta;\mu,\gamma)\,d\theta = e^{i n \mu-|n|\gamma}.$$

where $\Gamma\,$ is some interval of length $2\pi$. The first moment is then the average value of z, also known as the mean resultant, or mean resultant vector:

$$\langle z \rangle=e^{i\mu-\gamma}$$

The mean angle is

$$\langle \theta \rangle=\mathrm{Arg}\langle z \rangle = \mu$$

and the length of the mean resultant is

$$R=|\langle z \rangle| = e^{-\gamma}$$

yielding a circular variance of 1 − R.

== Estimation of parameters ==
A series of N measurements $z_n=e^{i\theta_n}$ drawn from a wrapped Cauchy distribution may be used to estimate certain parameters of the distribution. The average of the series $\overline{z}$ is defined as

$$\overline{z}=\frac{1}{N}\sum_{n=1}^N z_n$$

and its expectation value will be just the first moment:

$$\langle\overline{z}\rangle=e^{i\mu-\gamma}$$

In other words, $\overline{z}$ is an unbiased estimator of the first moment. If we assume that the peak position $\mu$ lies in the interval $[-\pi,\pi)$, then Arg$(\overline{z})$ will be a (biased) estimator of the peak position $\mu$.

Viewing the $z_n$ as a set of vectors in the complex plane, the $\overline{R}^2$ statistic is the length of the averaged vector:

$$\overline{R}^2=\overline{z}\,\overline{z^*}=\left(\frac{1}{N}\sum_{n=1}^N \cos\theta_n\right)^2+\left(\frac{1}{N}\sum_{n=1}^N \sin\theta_n\right)^2$$

and its expectation value is

$$\langle \overline{R}^2\rangle=\frac{1}{N}+\frac{N-1}{N}e^{-2\gamma}.$$

In other words, the statistic

$$R_e^2=\frac{N}{N-1}\left(\overline{R}^2-\frac{1}{N}\right)$$

will be an unbiased estimator of $e^{-2\gamma}$, and $\ln(1/R_e^2)/2$ will be a (biased) estimator of $\gamma$.

== Entropy ==
The information entropy of the wrapped Cauchy distribution is defined as:

$$H = -\int_\Gamma f_\text{WC}(\theta;\mu,\gamma)\,\ln(f_\text{WC}(\theta;\mu,\gamma))\,d\theta$$

where $\Gamma$ is any interval of length $2\pi$. The logarithm of the density of the wrapped Cauchy distribution may be written as a Fourier series in $\theta\,$:

$$\ln(f_\text{WC}(\theta;\mu,\gamma))=c_0+2\sum_{m=1}^\infty c_m \cos(m\theta)$$

where

$$c_m=\frac{1}{2\pi}\int_\Gamma \ln\left(\frac{\sinh\gamma}{2\pi(\cosh\gamma-\cos\theta)}\right)\cos(m \theta)\,d\theta$$

which yields:

$$c_0 =  \ln\left(\frac{1-e^{-2\gamma}}{2\pi}\right)$$

(cf. Gradshteyn and Ryzhik 4.224.15) and

$$c_m=\frac{e^{-m\gamma}}{m}\qquad \mathrm{for}\,m>0$$

(cf. Gradshteyn and Ryzhik 4.397.6). The characteristic function representation for the wrapped Cauchy distribution in the left side of the integral is:

$$f_\text{WC}(\theta;\mu,\gamma) =\frac{1}{2\pi}\left(1+2\sum_{n=1}^\infty\phi_n\cos(n\theta)\right)$$

where $\phi_n= e^{-|n|\gamma}$. Substituting these expressions into the entropy integral, exchanging the order of integration and summation, and using the orthogonality of the cosines, the entropy may be written:

$$H = -c_0-2\sum_{m=1}^\infty \phi_m c_m = -\ln\left(\frac{1-e^{-2\gamma}}{2\pi}\right)-2\sum_{m=1}^\infty \frac{e^{-2n\gamma}}{n}$$

The series is just the Taylor expansion for the logarithm of $(1-e^{-2\gamma})$ so the entropy may be written in closed form as:

$$H=\ln(2\pi(1-e^{-2\gamma}))\,$$

== Circular Cauchy distribution ==
If X is Cauchy distributed with median μ and scale parameter γ, then the complex variable

$$Z = \frac{X - i}{X+i}$$

has unit modulus and is distributed on the unit circle with density:

$$f_\text{CC}(\theta,\mu,\gamma)= \frac{1}{2\pi } \frac{1 - |\zeta|^2}{|e^{i \theta} - \zeta|^2}$$

where

$$\zeta = \frac{\psi - i}{\psi + i}$$

and ψ expresses the two parameters of the associated linear Cauchy distribution for x as a complex number:

$$\psi=\mu+i\gamma\,$$

It can be seen that the circular Cauchy distribution has the same functional form as the wrapped Cauchy distribution in z and ζ (i.e. f_{WC}(z, ζ)). The circular Cauchy distribution is a reparameterized wrapped Cauchy distribution:

$$f_\text{CC}(\theta,m,\gamma)=f_\text{WC}\left(e^{i \theta},\, \frac{m+i \gamma -i}{m+i\gamma+i}\right)$$

The distribution $f_\text{CC}(\theta; \mu,\gamma)$ is called the circular Cauchy distribution (also the complex Cauchy distribution) with parameters μ and γ. (See also McCullagh's parametrization of the Cauchy distributions and Poisson kernel for related concepts.)

The circular Cauchy distribution expressed in complex form has finite moments of all orders

$$\operatorname{E}[Z^n] = \zeta^n,  \quad \operatorname{E}[\bar Z^n] = \bar\zeta^n$$

for integer n ≥ 1. For |φ| < 1, the transformation

$$U(z, \phi) =  \frac{z - \phi}{1 - \bar \phi z}$$

is holomorphic on the unit disk, and the transformed variable U(Z, φ) is distributed as complex Cauchy with parameter U(ζ, φ).

Given a sample z_{1}, ..., z_{n} of size n > 2, the maximum-likelihood equation

$$n^{-1} U \left(z, \hat\zeta \right) = n^{-1} \sum U \left(z_j, \hat\zeta \right) = 0$$

can be solved by a simple fixed-point iteration:

$$\zeta^{(r+1)} = U \left(n^{-1} U(z, \zeta^{(r)}), \, - \zeta^{(r)} \right)\,$$

starting with ζ^{(0)} = 0. The sequence of likelihood values is non-decreasing, and the solution is unique for samples containing at least three distinct values.

The maximum-likelihood estimate for the median ($\hat\mu$) and scale parameter ($\hat\gamma$) of a real Cauchy sample is obtained by the inverse transformation:

$$\hat\mu \pm i\hat\gamma = i\frac{1+\hat\zeta}{1-\hat\zeta}.$$

For n ≤ 4, closed-form expressions are known for $\hat\zeta$. The density of the maximum-likelihood estimator at t in the unit disk is necessarily of the form:

$$\frac{1}{4\pi}\frac{p_n(\chi(t, \zeta))}{(1 - |t|^2)^2} ,$$

where

$$\chi(t, \zeta) = \frac{ |t - \zeta|^2}{4(1 - |t|^2)(1 - |\zeta|^2)}$$.

Formulae for p_{3} and p_{4} are available.

== See also ==
- Wrapped distribution
- Dirac comb
- Wrapped normal distribution
- Circular uniform distribution
- McCullagh's parametrization of the Cauchy distributions
