= Stable process =

In probability theory, a stable process is a type of stochastic process. It includes stochastic processes whose associated probability distributions are stable distributions.

Examples of stable processes include the Wiener process, or Brownian motion, whose associated probability distribution is the normal distribution. They also include the Cauchy process. For the symmetric Cauchy process, the associated probability distribution is the Cauchy distribution.

The degenerate case, where there is no random element, i.e., $X(t) = mt$, where $m$ is a constant, is also a stable process.
