= Discrete-stable distribution =

Discrete-stable distributions are a class of probability distributions with the property that the sum of several random variables from such a distribution under appropriate scaling is distributed according to the same family. They are the discrete analogue of continuous-stable distributions.

Discrete-stable distributions have been used in numerous fields, in particular in scale-free networks such as the internet and social networks or even semantic networks.

Both discrete and continuous classes of stable distribution have properties such as infinite divisibility, power law tails, and unimodality.

The most well-known discrete stable distribution is the special case of the Poisson distribution. It is the only discrete-stable distribution for which the mean and all higher-order moments are finite.

== Definition ==
The discrete-stable distributions are defined through their probability-generating function

$$G(s| \nu,a)=\sum_{n=0}^\infty P(N| \nu,a)s^N = \exp(a (s-1)^\nu).$$

In the above, $a>0$ is a scale parameter and $0<\nu\le1$ describes the power-law behaviour such that when $0<\nu<1$,

$$\lim_{N \to \infty}P(N|\nu,a) \sim \frac{1}{N^{\nu+1}}.$$

When $\nu=1$, the distribution becomes the familiar Poisson distribution with the mean $a$.

The characteristic function of a discrete-stable distribution has the form

$\varphi(t; a, \nu) = \exp \left[a \left( e^{it} - 1 \right)^\nu \right]$, with $a>0$ and $0<\nu\le1$.

Again, when $\nu=1$, the distribution becomes the Poisson distribution with mean $a$.

The original distribution is recovered through repeated differentiation of the generating function:

$$P(N|\nu,a)= \left.\frac{1}{N!}\frac{d^NG(s|\nu,a)}{ds^N}\right|_{s=0}.$$

A closed-form expression using elementary functions for the probability distribution of the discrete-stable distributions is not known except for in the Poisson case in which

$$\!P(N| \nu=1, a)= \frac{a^N e^{-a}}{N!}.$$

Expressions exist, however, that use special functions for the case $\nu=1/2$ (in terms of Bessel functions) and $\nu=1/3$ (in terms of hypergeometric functions).

== As compound probability distributions ==
The entire class of discrete-stable distributions can be formed as Poisson compound probability distribution where the mean, $\lambda$, of a Poisson distribution is defined as a random variable with a probability density function (PDF). When the PDF of the mean is a one-sided continuous-stable distribution with the stability parameter $0 < \alpha < 1$ and scale parameter $c$, the resultant distribution is discrete-stable with index $\nu = \alpha$ and scale parameter $a = c \sec( \alpha \pi / 2)$.

Formally, this is written

$$P(N| \alpha, c \sec( \alpha \pi / 2)) =
\int_0^\infty P(N| 1, \lambda)p(\lambda; \alpha, 1, c, 0) \, d\lambda$$

where $p(x; \alpha, 1, c, 0)$ is the pdf of a one-sided continuous-stable distribution with symmetry parameter $\beta=1$ and location parameter $\mu = 0$.

A more general result states that forming a compound distribution from any discrete-stable distribution with index $\nu$ with a one-sided continuous-stable distribution with index $\alpha$ results in a discrete-stable distribution with index $\nu \cdot \alpha$ and reduces the power-law index of the original distribution by a factor of $\alpha$.

In other words,

$$P(N| \nu \cdot \alpha, c \sec(\pi \alpha / 2)) =
\int_0^\infty P(N| \alpha, \lambda)p(\lambda; \nu, 1, c, 0) \, d\lambda.$$

== Poisson limit ==
In the limit $\nu \rarr 1$, the discrete-stable distributions behave like a Poisson distribution with mean $a \sec(\nu \pi / 2)$ for small $N$, but for $N \gg 1$, the power-law tail dominates.

The convergence of i.i.d. random variates with power-law tails $P(N) \sim 1/N^{1 + \nu}$ to a discrete-stable distribution is extraordinarily slow when $\nu \approx 1$, the limit being the Poisson distribution when $\nu > 1$ and $P(N| \nu, a)$ when $\nu \leq 1$.

== See also ==
- Stable distribution
- Poisson distribution
