= Probable error =

Measure of statistical dispersion

In statistics, probable error defines the half-range of an interval about a central point for the distribution, such that half of the values from the distribution will lie within the interval and half outside. Thus for a symmetric distribution it is equivalent to half the interquartile range, or the median absolute deviation. One such use of the term probable error in this sense is as the name for the scale parameter of the Cauchy distribution, which does not have a standard deviation.

The probable error can also be expressed as a multiple of the standard deviation σ, which requires that at least the second statistical moment of the distribution should exist, whereas the other definition does not. For a normal distribution this is $\gamma = 0.6745 \times \sigma$.

== See also ==
- Average absolute deviation
- Circular error probable
- Confidence interval
- Standard error
