= McCullagh's parametrization of the Cauchy distributions =

In probability theory, the "standard" Cauchy distribution is the probability distribution whose probability density function (pdf) is

$$f(x) = {1 \over \pi (1 + x^2)}$$

for x real. This has median 0, and first and third quartiles respectively −1 and +1. Generally, a Cauchy distribution is any probability distribution belonging to the same location-scale family as this one. Thus, if X has a standard Cauchy distribution and μ is any real number and σ > 0, then Y = μ + σX has a Cauchy distribution whose median is μ and whose first and third quartiles are respectively μ − σ and μ + σ.

McCullagh's parametrization, introduced by Peter McCullagh, professor of statistics at the University of Chicago, uses the two parameters of the non-standardised distribution to form a single complex-valued parameter, specifically, the complex number θ = μ + iσ, where i is the imaginary unit. It also extends the usual range of scale parameter to include σ < 0.

Although the parameter is notionally expressed using a complex number, the density is still a density over the real line. In particular the density can be written using the real-valued parameters μ and σ, which can each take positive or negative values, as

$$f(x) = {1 \over \pi \left \vert \sigma \right \vert \left(1 + \frac{(x-\mu)^2}{\sigma^2} \right) }\,,$$

where the distribution is regarded as degenerate if σ = 0. An alternative form for the density can be written using the complex parameter θ = μ + iσ as

$$f(x) = {\left \vert \Im{\theta} \right \vert  \over \pi \left \vert x-\theta \right \vert^2} \,,$$

where $\Im{\theta} = \sigma$.

To the question "Why introduce complex numbers when only real-valued random variables are involved?", McCullagh wrote:

To this question I can give no better answer than to present the curious result that

$$Y^* = {aY + b \over cY + d} \sim C\left({a\theta + b \over c\theta + d}\right)$$

for all real numbers a, b, c and d. ...the induced transformation on the parameter space has the same fractional linear form as the transformation on the sample space only if the parameter space is taken to be the complex plane.

In other words, if the random variable Y has a Cauchy distribution with complex parameter θ, then the random variable Y^{*} defined above has a Cauchy distribution with parameter (aθ + b)/(cθ + d).

McCullagh also wrote, "The distribution of the first exit point from the upper half-plane of a Brownian particle starting at θ is the Cauchy density on the real line with parameter θ." In addition, McCullagh shows that the complex-valued parameterisation allows a simple relationship to be made between the Cauchy and the "circular Cauchy distribution".

Using the complex parameter also let easily prove the invariance of f-divergences (e.g., Kullback-Leibler divergence, chi-squared divergence, etc.) with respect to real linear fractional transformations (group action of SL(2,R)), and show that all f-divergences between univariate Cauchy densities are symmetric.

== See also ==
- Complex random variable
