= Cauchy distribution =

Probability distribution

Cauchy
- Probability density function The purple curve is the standard Cauchy distribution

- Cumulative distribution function
- Parameters: $x_0\!$ location (real) $\gamma > 0$ scale (real)
- Support: $\displaystyle x \in (-\infty, +\infty)\!$
- PDF: $\frac{1}{\pi\gamma\,\left[1 + \left(\frac{x-x_0}{\gamma}\right)^2\right]}\!$
- CDF: $\frac{1}{\pi} \arctan\left(\frac{x-x_0}{\gamma}\right)+\frac{1}{2}\!$
- Quantile: $x_0+\gamma\,\tan[\pi(p-\tfrac{1}{2})]$
- Mean: undefined
- Median: $x_0\!$
- Mode: $x_0\!$
- Variance: undefined
- MAD: $\gamma$
- Skewness: undefined
- Excess kurtosis: undefined
- Entropy: $\log(4\pi\gamma)\!$
- MGF: does not exist
- CF: $\displaystyle \exp(x_0\,i\,t-\gamma\,|t|)\!$
- Fisher information: $\frac{1}{2\gamma^2}$

The Cauchy distribution, named after Augustin-Louis Cauchy, is a continuous probability distribution. It is also known, especially among physicists, as the Lorentz distribution (after Hendrik Lorentz), Cauchy–Lorentz distribution, Lorentz(ian) function, or Breit–Wigner distribution. The Cauchy distribution $f(x; x_0,\gamma)$ is the distribution of the x-intercept of a ray issuing from $(x_0,\gamma)$ with a uniformly distributed angle. It is also the distribution of the ratio of two independent normally distributed random variables with mean zero.

The Cauchy distribution is often used in statistics as the canonical example of a "pathological" distribution since both its expected value and its variance are undefined (but see § Moments below). The Cauchy distribution does not have finite moments of order greater than or equal to one; only fractional absolute moments exist. The Cauchy distribution has no moment generating function.

In mathematics, it is closely related to the Poisson kernel, which is the fundamental solution for the Laplace equation in the upper half-plane.

It is one of the few stable distributions with a probability density function that can be expressed analytically, the others being the normal distribution and the Lévy distribution.

== Definitions ==
Here are the most important constructions.

=== Rotational symmetry ===
If one stands in front of a wall and kicks a ball at a uniformly distributed random angle towards it, assuming the length of the wall to be infinite (stretching forever on both sides), then the distribution of the point where the ball hits the wall is a Cauchy distribution.

Rephrasing in mathematical notation, assume the wall is positioned as $x=d$, and that the ball (kicked by someone standing in the origin) hits the wall at $(d, y)$, and then consider the line passing through that point and the origin. If the direction (angle from the $x$-axis to this line) is chosen uniformly between −90° and +90° at random, the coordinate of the intersection of the line with the wall follows a Cauchy distribution.

This definition gives a simple way to sample from the standard Cauchy distribution. Let $\theta$ be a sample from a uniform distribution from $\left[-\frac{\pi}{2},+\frac{\pi}{2}\right]$, denoting the direction of the kick (in radians). Then, we can generate a sample $w$ from the standard Cauchy distribution using
$$w = d\tan{\theta}$$

When $U$ and $V$ are two independent normally distributed random variables with expected value 0 and variance 1, then the ratio $U/V$ has the standard Cauchy distribution.

More generally, if $(U, V)$ is a rotationally symmetric distribution on the plane, then the ratio $U/V$ has the standard Cauchy distribution. This is because $U/V$ produces the same distribution as $\tan(\theta)$ where $\theta \sim \mathrm{Uniform}(-\tfrac{\pi}{2}, \tfrac{\pi}{2})$ due to rotational symmetry.

=== Probability density function (PDF) ===
The Cauchy distribution is the probability distribution with the following probability density function (PDF)
$$f(x; x_0,\gamma) = \frac{1}{\pi\gamma \left[1 + \left(\frac{x - x_0}{\gamma}\right)^2\right]} = { 1 \over \pi } \left[ { \gamma \over (x - x_0)^2 + \gamma^2  } \right],$$

where $x_0$ is the location parameter, specifying the location of the peak of the distribution, and $\gamma$ is the scale parameter which specifies the half-width at half-maximum (HWHM), alternatively $2\gamma$ is full width at half maximum (FWHM). $\gamma$ is also equal to half the interquartile range and is sometimes called the probable error. This function is also known as a Lorentzian function, and an example of a nascent delta function, and therefore approaches a Dirac delta function in the limit as $\gamma \to 0$. Augustin-Louis Cauchy exploited such a density function in 1827 with an infinitesimal scale parameter, defining this Dirac delta function.

==== Properties of PDF ====
The maximum value or amplitude of the Cauchy PDF is $\frac{1}{\pi \gamma}$, located at $x=x_0$.

It is sometimes convenient to express the PDF in terms of the complex parameter $\psi= x_0 + i\gamma$

$$f(x;\psi)=\frac{1}{\pi}\,\textrm{Im}\left(\frac{1}{x-\psi}\right)=\frac{1}{\pi}\,\textrm{Re}\left(\frac{-i}{x-\psi}\right)$$

The special case when $x_0 = 0$ and $\gamma = 1$ is called the standard Cauchy distribution with the probability density function
$$f(x; 0,1) = \frac{1}{\pi \left(1 + x^2\right)}.$$

In physics, a three-parameter Lorentzian function is often used:
$$f(x; x_0,\gamma,I) = \frac{I}{\left[1 + {\left(\frac{x-x_0}{\gamma}\right)}^2\right]} = I \left[ \frac{\gamma^2}{{\left(x - x_0\right)}^2 + \gamma^2  } \right],$$
where $I$ is the height of the peak. The three-parameter Lorentzian function indicated is not, in general, a probability density function, since it does not integrate to 1, except in the special case where $I = \frac{1}{\pi\gamma}.\!$

=== Cumulative distribution function (CDF) ===
The Cauchy distribution is the probability distribution with the following cumulative distribution function (CDF):
$$F(x; x_0,\gamma)=\frac{1}{\pi} \arctan\left(\frac{x-x_0}{\gamma}\right)+\frac{1}{2}$$

and the quantile function (inverse cdf) of the Cauchy distribution is
$$Q(p; x_0,\gamma) = x_0 + \gamma\,\tan\left[\pi\left(p-\tfrac{1}{2}\right)\right].$$
It follows that the first and third quartiles are $(x_0 - \gamma, x_0 + \gamma)$, and hence the interquartile range is $2\gamma$.

For the standard distribution, the cumulative distribution function simplifies to arctangent function $\arctan(x)$:
$$F(x; 0,1)=\frac{1}{\pi} \arctan\left(x\right)+\frac{1}{2}$$

=== Other constructions ===
The standard Cauchy distribution is the Student's t-distribution with one degree of freedom, and so it may be constructed by any method that constructs the Student's t-distribution.

If $\Sigma$ is a $p\times p$ positive-semidefinite covariance matrix with strictly positive diagonal entries, then for independent and identically distributed $X,Y\sim N(0,\Sigma)$ and any random $p$-vector $w$ independent of $X$ and $Y$ such that $w_1+\cdots+w_p=1$ and $w_i\geq 0, i=1,\ldots,p,$ (defining a categorical distribution) it holds that
$$\sum_{j=1}^p w_j\frac{X_j}{Y_j}\sim\mathrm{Cauchy}(0,1).$$

== Properties ==
The Cauchy distribution is an example of a distribution which has no mean, variance or higher moments defined. Its mode and median are well defined and are both equal to $x_0$.

The Cauchy distribution is an infinitely divisible probability distribution. It is also a strictly stable distribution.

The family of Cauchy-distributed random variables is closed under linear fractional transformations with real coefficients. In this connection, see also McCullagh's parametrization of the Cauchy distributions.

=== Sum of Cauchy-distributed random variables ===
If $X_1, X_2, \ldots, X_n$ are an IID sample from the standard Cauchy distribution, then their sample mean $\bar X = \frac 1 n \sum_i X_i$ is also standard Cauchy distributed. In particular, the average does not converge to the mean, and so the standard Cauchy distribution does not follow the law of large numbers.

This can be proved by repeated integration with the PDF, or more conveniently, by using the characteristic function of the standard Cauchy distribution (see below):
$$\varphi_X(t) = \operatorname{E}\left[e^{iXt} \right ] =  e^{-|t|}.$$
With this, we have $\varphi_{\sum_i X_i}(t) = e^{-n |t|}$, and so $\bar X$ has a standard Cauchy distribution.

More generally, if $X_1, X_2, \ldots, X_n$ are independent and Cauchy distributed with location parameters $x_1, \ldots, x_n$ and scales $\gamma_1, \ldots, \gamma_n$, and $a_1, \ldots, a_n$ are real numbers, then $\sum_i a_i X_i$ is Cauchy distributed with location $\sum_i a_i x_i$ and scale$\sum_i |a_i| \gamma_i$. We see that there is no law of large numbers for any weighted sum of independent Cauchy distributions.

This shows that the condition of finite variance in the central limit theorem cannot be dropped. It is also an example of a more generalized version of the central limit theorem that is characteristic of all stable distributions, of which the Cauchy distribution is a special case.

=== Central limit theorem ===
If $X_1, X_2, \ldots$ are an IID sample with PDF $\rho$ such that $\lim_{c \to \infty} \frac{1}{c} \int_{-c}^c x^2 \rho(x) \, dx = \frac{2\gamma}{\pi}$ is finite, but nonzero, then $\frac 1n \sum_{i=1}^n X_i$ converges in distribution to a Cauchy distribution with scale $\gamma$.

=== Characteristic function ===
Let $X$ denote a Cauchy distributed random variable. The characteristic function of the Cauchy distribution is given by

$$\varphi_X(t) = \operatorname{E}\left[e^{iXt} \right ] =\int_{-\infty}^\infty f(x;x_0,\gamma)e^{ixt}\,dx =  e^{ix_0t - \gamma |t|}.$$

which is just the Fourier transform of the probability density. The original probability density may be expressed in terms of the characteristic function, essentially by using the inverse Fourier transform:

$$f(x; x_0,\gamma) = \frac{1}{2\pi}\int_{-\infty}^\infty \varphi_X(t;x_0,\gamma)e^{-ixt} \, dt \!$$

The nth moment of a distribution is the nth derivative of the characteristic function evaluated at $t=0$. Observe that the characteristic function is not differentiable at the origin: this corresponds to the fact that the Cauchy distribution does not have well-defined moments higher than the zeroth moment.

=== Kullback–Leibler divergence ===
The Kullback–Leibler divergence between two Cauchy distributions has the following symmetric closed-form formula:
$$\mathrm{KL}\left(p_{x_{0,1}, \gamma_{1}}: p_{x_{0,2}, \gamma_{2}}\right) = \log \frac{{\left(\gamma_1 + \gamma_2\right)}^2 + {\left(x_{0,1} - x_{0,2}\right)}^2}{4 \gamma_1 \gamma_2}.$$

Any f-divergence between two Cauchy distributions is symmetric and can be expressed as a function of the chi-squared divergence. Closed-form expression for the total variation, Jensen–Shannon divergence, Hellinger distance, etc. are available.

=== Entropy ===
The entropy of the Cauchy distribution is given by:

$$\begin{align}
H(\gamma) & =-\int_{-\infty}^\infty f(x;x_0,\gamma) \log(f(x;x_0,\gamma)) \, dx \\[6pt]
& =\log(4\pi\gamma)
\end{align}$$

The derivative of the quantile function, the quantile density function, for the Cauchy distribution is:

$$Q'(p; \gamma) = \gamma \pi \, \sec^2\left[\pi\left(p - \tfrac{1}{2}\right)\right].$$

The differential entropy of a distribution can be defined in terms of its quantile density, specifically:

$$H(\gamma) = \int_0^1 \log\,(Q'(p; \gamma))\,\mathrm dp = \log(4\pi\gamma)$$

The Cauchy distribution is the maximum entropy probability distribution for a random variate $X$ for which

$$\operatorname{E}\left[\log\left(1 + {\left(\frac{X-x_0}{\gamma}\right)}^2\right)\right] = \log 4$$

=== Moments ===
The Cauchy distribution is usually used as an illustrative counterexample in elementary probability courses, as a distribution with no well-defined (or "indefinite") moments.

==== Sample moments ====
If we take an IID sample $X_1, X_2, \ldots$ from the standard Cauchy distribution, then the sequence of their sample mean is $S_n = \frac{1}{n} \sum_{i=1}^n X_i$, which also has the standard Cauchy distribution. Consequently, no matter how many terms we take, the sample average does not converge.

Similarly, the sample variance $V_n = \frac{1}{n} \sum_{i=1}^n {\left(X_i - S_n\right)}^2$ also does not converge.

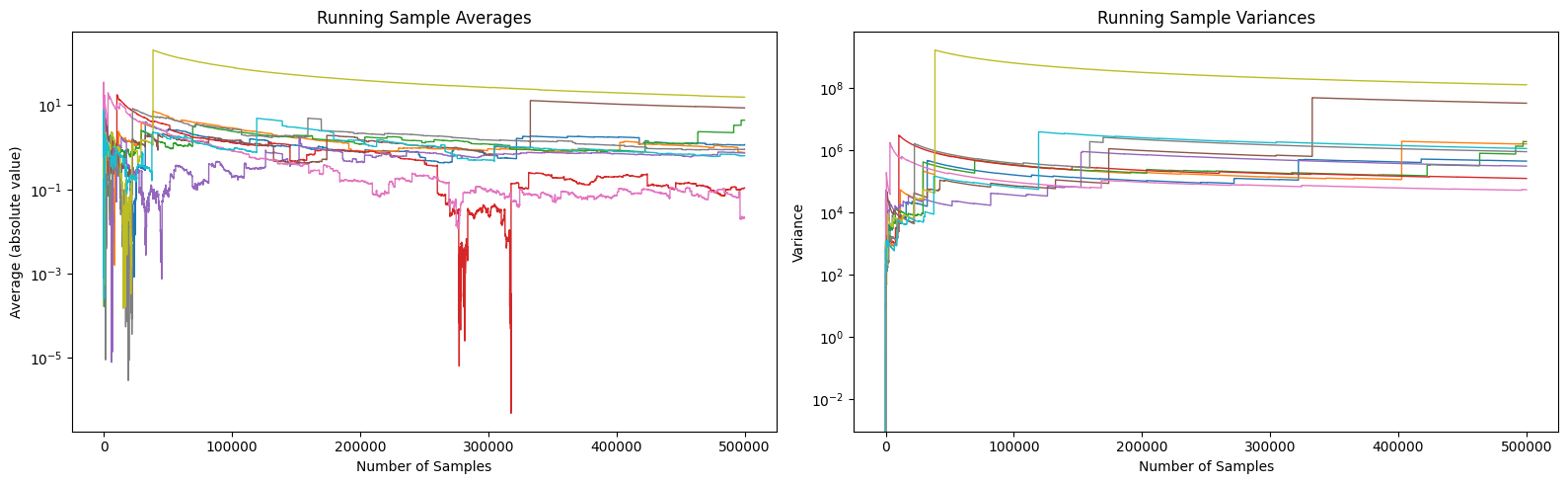
A typical trajectory of sample means looks like long periods of slow convergence to zero, punctuated by large jumps away from zero, but never getting too far away. A typical trajectory of sample variances looks similar, but the jumps accumulate faster than the decay, diverging to infinity.

A typical trajectory of $S_1, S_2, ...$ looks like long periods of slow convergence to zero, punctuated by large jumps away from zero, but never getting too far away. A typical trajectory of $V_1, V_2, ...$ looks similar, but the jumps accumulate faster than the decay, diverging to infinity. These two kinds of trajectories are plotted in the figure.

Moments of sample lower than order 1 would converge to zero. Moments of sample higher than order 2 would diverge to infinity even faster than sample variance.

==== Mean ====
If a probability distribution has a density function $f(x)$, then the mean, if it exists, is given by

$$\int_{-\infty}^\infty x f(x)\,dx.$$	1

We may evaluate this two-sided improper integral by computing the sum of two one-sided improper integrals. That is,

$$\int_{-\infty}^a x f(x)\,dx +\int_a^\infty x f(x) \, dx$$	2

for an arbitrary real number $a$.

For the integral to exist (even as an infinite value), at least one of the terms in this sum should be finite, or both should be infinite and have the same sign. But in the case of the Cauchy distribution, both the terms in this sum (2) are infinite and have opposite sign. Hence (1) is undefined, and thus so is the mean. When the mean of a probability distribution function (PDF) is undefined, no one can compute a reliable average over the experimental data points, regardless of the sample's size.

Note that the Cauchy principal value of the mean of the Cauchy distribution is
$$\lim_{a\to\infty}\int_{-a}^a x f(x)\,dx$$
which is zero. On the other hand, the related integral
$$\lim_{a\to\infty}\int_{-2a}^a x f(x)\,dx$$
is not zero, as can be seen by computing the integral. This again shows that the mean (1) cannot exist.

Various results in probability theory about expected values, such as the strong law of large numbers, fail to hold for the Cauchy distribution.

==== Smaller moments ====
The absolute moments for $p\in(-1,1)$ are defined. For $X\sim\mathrm{Cauchy}(0,\gamma)$ we have
$$\operatorname{E}[|X|^p] = \gamma^p \mathrm{sec}(\pi p/2).$$

==== Higher moments ====
The Cauchy distribution does not have finite moments of any order. Some of the higher raw moments do exist and have a value of infinity, for example, the raw second moment:

$$\begin{align}
\operatorname{E}[X^2] & \propto \int_{-\infty}^\infty \frac{x^2}{1+x^2}\,dx = \int_{-\infty}^\infty 1 - \frac{1}{1+x^2}\,dx \\[8pt]
& = \int_{-\infty}^\infty dx - \int_{-\infty}^\infty \frac{1}{1+x^2}\,dx = \int_{-\infty}^\infty dx-\pi = \infty.
\end{align}$$

By re-arranging the formula, one can see that the second moment is essentially the infinite integral of a constant (here 1). Higher even-powered raw moments will also evaluate to infinity. Odd-powered raw moments, however, are undefined, which is distinctly different from existing with the value of infinity. The odd-powered raw moments are undefined because their values are essentially equivalent to $\infty - \infty$ since the two halves of the integral both diverge and have opposite signs. The first raw moment is the mean, which, being odd, does not exist. (See also the discussion above about this.) This in turn means that all of the central moments and standardized moments are undefined since they are all based on the mean. The variance—which is the second central moment—is likewise non-existent (despite the fact that the raw second moment exists with the value infinity).

The results for higher moments follow from Hölder's inequality, which implies that higher moments (or halves of moments) diverge if lower ones do.

==== Moments of truncated distributions ====
Consider the truncated distribution defined by restricting the standard Cauchy distribution to the interval [−10^{100}, 10^{100}]. Such a truncated distribution has all moments (and the central limit theorem applies for i.i.d. observations from it); yet for almost all practical purposes it behaves like a Cauchy distribution.

=== Transformation properties ===
- If $X \sim \operatorname{Cauchy}(x_0,\gamma)$ then $kX + \ell \sim \textrm{Cauchy}(x_0 k+\ell, \gamma |k|)$
- If $X \sim \operatorname{Cauchy}(x_0, \gamma_0)$ and $Y \sim \operatorname{Cauchy}(x_1,\gamma_1)$ are independent, then $X+Y \sim \operatorname{Cauchy}(x_0+x_1,\gamma_0 +\gamma_1)$ and $X-Y \sim \operatorname{Cauchy}(x_0-x_1, \gamma_0+\gamma_1)$
- If $X \sim \operatorname{Cauchy}(0,\gamma)$ then $\tfrac{1}{X} \sim \operatorname{Cauchy}(0, \tfrac{1}{\gamma})$
- McCullagh's parametrization of the Cauchy distributions: Expressing a Cauchy distribution in terms of one complex parameter $\psi = x_0+i\gamma$, define $X \sim \operatorname{Cauchy}(\psi)$ to mean $X \sim \operatorname{Cauchy}(x_0,|\gamma|)$. If $X \sim \operatorname{Cauchy}(\psi)$ then:
  $$\frac{aX+b}{cX+d} \sim \operatorname{Cauchy}\left(\frac{a\psi+b}{c\psi+d}\right)$$
  where $a$, $b$, $c$ and $d$ are real numbers.
- Using the same convention as above, if $X \sim \operatorname{Cauchy}(\psi)$ then:
  $$\frac{X-i}{X+i} \sim \operatorname{CCauchy}\left(\frac{\psi-i}{\psi+i}\right)$$
  where $\operatorname{CCauchy}$ is the circular Cauchy distribution.

== Statistical inference ==
=== Estimation of parameters ===
Because the parameters of the Cauchy distribution do not correspond to a mean and variance, attempting to estimate the parameters of the Cauchy distribution by using a sample mean and a sample variance will not succeed. For example, if an i.i.d. sample of size n is taken from a Cauchy distribution, one may calculate the sample mean as:

$$\bar{x}=\frac 1 n \sum_{i=1}^n x_i$$

Although the sample values $x_i$ will be concentrated about the central value $x_0$, the sample mean will become increasingly variable as more observations are taken, because of the increased probability of encountering sample points with a large absolute value. In fact, the distribution of the sample mean will be equal to the distribution of the observations themselves; i.e., the sample mean of a large sample is no better (or worse) an estimator of $x_0$ than any single observation from the sample. Similarly, calculating the sample variance will result in values that grow larger as more observations are taken.

Therefore, more robust means of estimating the central value $x_0$ and the scaling parameter $\gamma$ are needed. One simple method is to take the median value of the sample as an estimator of $x_0$ and half the sample interquartile range as an estimator of $\gamma$. Other, more precise and robust methods have been developed. For example, the truncated mean of the middle 24% of the sample order statistics produces an estimate for $x_0$ that is more efficient than using either the sample median or the full sample mean. However, because of the fat tails of the Cauchy distribution, the efficiency of the estimator decreases if more than 24% of the sample is used.

Another simple method is to consider a complex-valued Quasi-arithmetic mean of sample. Let
$$\theta_n = f^{-1} \left(\frac{1}{n} \sum_{i=1}^{n} f(x_i) \right),$$
where $f$ is a generator of the quasi-arithmetic mean. If $f(x) = \log (x+\alpha), \alpha \in \overline{\mathbb{H}}$ then, $\theta_n$ is a complex-valued geometric mean $\prod_{i=1}^{n} (x_i + \alpha)^{1/n}$, and, if $f(x) = 1/(x+\alpha), \alpha \in \mathbb{H}$ then, $\theta_n$ is a complex-valued harmonic mean $\frac{\sum_{i=1}^{n} x_i / (x_i + \alpha)}{\sum_{i=1}^{n} 1/(x_i + \alpha)}$. $(\theta_n)_n$ is a closed-form unbiased strongly-consistent estimator for the joint of the location and scale parameters under McCullagh's parametrization of the Cauchy distributions. The central limit theorem and the Bahadur efficiency also hold for $(\theta_n)_n$.

Maximum likelihood can also be used to estimate the parameters $x_0$ and $\gamma$. However, this tends to be complicated by the fact that this requires finding the roots of a high degree polynomial, and there can be multiple roots that represent local maxima. Also, while the maximum likelihood estimator is asymptotically efficient, it is relatively inefficient for small samples. The log-likelihood function for the Cauchy distribution for sample size $n$ is:

$$\ell(x_1,\dotsc,x_n \mid \!x_0,\gamma ) = - n \log (\gamma \pi) - \sum_{i=1}^n \log \left(1 + \left(\frac{x_i - x_0}{\gamma}\right)^2\right)$$

$$\qquad \qquad = - n \log (\pi) + n \log (\gamma)- \sum_{i=1}^n \log \left(\gamma^2 + \left(x_i - x_0\right)^2\right).$$

Maximizing the log likelihood function with respect to $x_0$ and $\gamma$ by taking the first derivative produces the following system of equations:

$$\frac{\partial \ell}{\partial x_{0}} =  -\sum_{i=1}^n \frac{2(x_i - x_0)}{\gamma^2 + \left(x_i - \!x_0\right)^2} =0$$
$$\frac{\partial \ell}{\partial \gamma} = \frac{n}{\gamma}-\sum_{i=1}^n \frac{2\gamma}{\gamma^2 + \left(x_i - x_0\right)^2} = 0$$

Note that

$$\frac{n}{\gamma}-\sum_{i=1}^n \frac{2\gamma}{\gamma^2 + \left(x_i - x_0\right)^2} = 0$$

is equivalent to

$$\sum_{i=1}^n \frac{\left(x_i - x_0\right)^2}{\gamma^2 + \left(x_i - x_0\right)^2} = \frac{n}{2}$$

and that

$$\sum_{i=1}^n \frac{\left(x_i - x_0\right)^2}{\gamma^2 + \left(x_i - x_0\right)^2}$$

is a monotone function in $\gamma$ and that the solution $\gamma$ must satisfy

$$\min |x_i-x_0|\le \gamma\le \max |x_i-x_0|.$$

Solving just for $x_0$ requires solving a polynomial of degree $2n-1$, and solving just for $\,\!\gamma$ requires solving a polynomial of degree $2n$. Therefore, whether solving for one parameter or for both parameters simultaneously, a numerical solution on a computer is typically required. The benefit of maximum likelihood estimation is asymptotic efficiency; estimating $x_0$ using the sample median is only about 81% as asymptotically efficient as estimating $x_0$ by maximum likelihood. The truncated sample mean using the middle 24% order statistics is about 88% as asymptotically efficient an estimator of $x_0$ as the maximum likelihood estimate. When Newton's method is used to find the solution for the maximum likelihood estimate, the middle 24% order statistics can be used as an initial solution for $x_0$.

The shape can be estimated using the median of absolute values, since for location 0 Cauchy variables $X\sim\mathrm{Cauchy}(0,\gamma)$, the $\operatorname{median}(|X|) = \gamma$ the shape parameter.

== Related distributions ==
=== General ===
- $\operatorname{Cauchy}(0,1) \sim \textrm{t}(\mathrm{df}=1)\,$ Student's t distribution
- $\operatorname{Cauchy}(\mu,\sigma) \sim \textrm{t}_{(\mathrm{df}=1)}(\mu,\sigma)\,$ non-standardized Student's t distribution
- If $X, Y \sim \textrm{N}(0,1)\, X, Y$ independent, then $\tfrac X Y\sim \textrm{Cauchy}(0,1)\,$
- If $X \sim \textrm{U}(0,1)\,$ then $\tan \left( \pi \left(X-\tfrac{1}{2}\right) \right) \sim \textrm{Cauchy}(0,1)\,$
- If $X \sim \operatorname{Log-Cauchy}(0, 1)$ then $\ln(X) \sim \textrm{Cauchy}(0, 1)$
- If $X \sim \operatorname{Cauchy}(x_0,\gamma)$ then $\tfrac1X \sim \operatorname{Cauchy}\left(\tfrac{x_0}{x_0^2+\gamma^2},\tfrac{\gamma}{x_0^2+\gamma^2}\right)$
- The Cauchy distribution is a limiting case of a Pearson distribution of type 4
- The Cauchy distribution is a special case of a Pearson distribution of type 7.
- The Cauchy distribution is a stable distribution: if $X \sim \textrm{Stable}(1, 0, \gamma, \mu)$, then $X \sim \operatorname{Cauchy}(\mu, \gamma)$.
- The Cauchy distribution is a singular limit of a hyperbolic distribution
- The wrapped Cauchy distribution, taking values on a circle, is derived from the Cauchy distribution by wrapping it around the circle.
- If $X \sim \textrm{N}(0,1)$, $Z \sim \operatorname{Inverse-Gamma}(1/2, s^2/2)$, then $Y = \mu + X \sqrt Z \sim \operatorname{Cauchy}(\mu,s)$. For half-Cauchy distributions, the relation holds by setting $X \sim \textrm{N}(0,1) I\{X\ge0\}$.

=== Lévy measure ===
The Cauchy distribution is the stable distribution of index 1. The Lévy–Khintchine representation of such a stable distribution of parameter $\gamma$ is given, for $X \sim \operatorname{Stable}(\gamma, 0, 0)\,$ by:

$$\operatorname{E}\left( e^{ixX} \right) = \exp\left( \int_{ \mathbb{R} } (e^{ixy} - 1) \Pi_\gamma(dy) \right)$$

where

$$\Pi_\gamma(dy) = \left( c_{1, \gamma}  \frac{1}{y^{1 + \gamma}} 1_{ \left\{y > 0\right\} } + c_{2,\gamma}  \frac{1}{|y|^{1 + \gamma}} 1_{\left\{ y < 0 \right\}} \right) \, dy$$

and $c_{1, \gamma}, c_{2, \gamma}$ can be expressed explicitly. In the case $\gamma = 1$ of the Cauchy distribution, one has $c_{1, \gamma} = c_{2, \gamma}$.

This last representation is a consequence of the formula

$$\pi |x| = \operatorname{PV }\int_{\mathbb{R} \smallsetminus\lbrace 0 \rbrace} (1 - e^{ixy}) \, \frac{dy}{y^2}$$

=== Multivariate Cauchy distribution ===
A random vector $X=(X_1, \ldots, X_k)^T$ is said to have the multivariate Cauchy distribution if every linear combination of its components $Y=a_1X_1+ \cdots + a_kX_k$ has a Cauchy distribution. That is, for any constant vector $a\in \mathbb R^k$, the random variable $Y=a^TX$ should have a univariate Cauchy distribution. The characteristic function of a multivariate Cauchy distribution is given by:

$$\varphi_X(t) =  e^{ix_0(t)-\gamma(t)}, \!$$

where $x_0(t)$ and $\gamma(t)$ are real functions with $x_0(t)$ a homogeneous function of degree one and $\gamma(t)$ a positive homogeneous function of degree one. More formally:

$$\begin{align}
x_0(at) &= a x_0(t), \\
\gamma (at) &= |a| \gamma (t),
\end{align}$$

for all $t$.

An example of a bivariate Cauchy distribution can be given by:
$$f(x, y; x_0,y_0,\gamma) = \frac{1}{2 \pi} \, \frac{\gamma}{{\left({\left(x - x_0\right)}^2 + {\left(y - y_0\right)}^2 + \gamma^2\right)}^{3/2}} .$$
Note that in this example, even though the covariance between $x$ and $y$ is 0, $x$ and $y$ are not statistically independent.

We also can write this formula for complex variable. Then the probability density function of complex Cauchy is :

$$f(z; z_0,\gamma) = \frac{1}{2\pi} \,\frac{\gamma}{{\left({\left|z - z_0\right|}^2 + \gamma^2\right)}^{3/2} }  .$$

Like how the standard Cauchy distribution is the Student t-distribution with one degree of freedom, the multidimensional Cauchy density is the multivariate Student distribution with one degree of freedom. The density of a $k$ dimension Student distribution with one degree of freedom is:

$$f(\mathbf{x}; \boldsymbol{\mu},\mathbf{\Sigma}, k)= \frac{\Gamma{\left(\frac{1+k}{2}\right)}}{\Gamma(\frac{1}{2}) \pi^{\frac{k}{2}} \left|\mathbf{\Sigma}\right|^{\frac{1}{2}} \left[1 + ({\mathbf x}-{\boldsymbol\mu})^\mathsf{T} {\mathbf\Sigma}^{-1} ({\mathbf x}-{\boldsymbol\mu})\right]^{\frac{1+k}{2}}} .$$

The properties of multidimensional Cauchy distribution are then special cases of the multivariate Student distribution.

== Occurrence and applications ==
=== In general ===
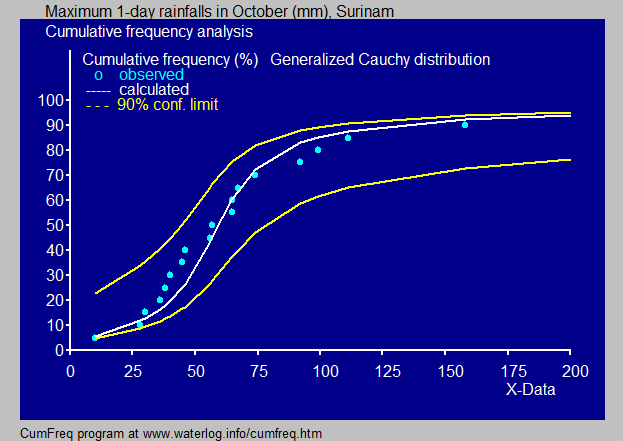
Fitted cumulative Cauchy distribution to maximum one-day rainfalls

- In spectroscopy, the Cauchy distribution describes the shape of spectral lines which are subject to homogeneous broadening in which all atoms interact in the same way with the frequency range contained in the line shape. Many mechanisms cause homogeneous broadening, most notably collision broadening. Lifetime or natural broadening also gives rise to a line shape described by the Cauchy distribution.
- Applications of the Cauchy distribution or its transformation can be found in fields working with exponential growth. A 1958 paper by White derived the test statistic for estimators of $\hat{\beta}$ for the equation $x_{t+1}=\beta{x}_t+\varepsilon_{t+1},\beta>1$ and where the maximum likelihood estimator is found using ordinary least squares showed the sampling distribution of the statistic is the Cauchy distribution.
- The Cauchy distribution is often the distribution of observations for objects that are spinning. The classic reference for this is called the Gull's lighthouse problem and as in the above section as the Breit–Wigner distribution in particle physics.
- In hydrology the Cauchy distribution is applied to extreme events such as annual maximum one-day rainfalls and river discharges. The blue picture illustrates an example of fitting the Cauchy distribution to ranked monthly maximum one-day rainfalls showing also the 90% confidence belt based on the binomial distribution. The rainfall data are represented by plotting positions as part of the cumulative frequency analysis.
- The expression for the imaginary part of complex electrical permittivity, according to the Lorentz model, is a Cauchy distribution.
- As an additional distribution to model fat tails in computational finance, Cauchy distributions can be used to model VAR (value at risk) producing a much larger probability of extreme risk than Gaussian Distribution.

=== Relativistic Breit–Wigner distribution ===
In nuclear and particle physics, the energy profile of a resonance is described by the relativistic Breit–Wigner distribution, while the Cauchy distribution is the (non-relativistic) Breit–Wigner distribution.

== History ==
Estimating the mean and standard deviation through a sample from a Cauchy distribution (bottom) does not converge as the size of the sample grows, as in the normal distribution (top). There can be arbitrarily large jumps in the estimates, as seen in the graphs on the bottom. (Click to expand)

A function with the form of the density function of the Cauchy distribution was studied geometrically by Fermat in 1659, and later was known as the witch of Agnesi, after Maria Gaetana Agnesi included it as an example in her 1748 calculus textbook. Despite its name, the first explicit analysis of the properties of the Cauchy distribution was published by the French mathematician Poisson in 1824, with Cauchy only becoming associated with it during an academic controversy in 1853. Poisson noted that if the mean of observations following such a distribution were taken, the standard deviation did not converge to any finite number. As such, Laplace's use of the central limit theorem with such a distribution was inappropriate, as it assumed a finite mean and variance. Despite this, Poisson did not regard the issue as important, in contrast to Bienaymé, who thought it was unrealistic to consider such a distribution and engaged Cauchy in a long dispute over the matter.

== See also ==
- Lévy flight and Lévy process
- Laplace distribution, the Fourier transform of the Cauchy distribution
- Cauchy process
- Stable process
- Slash distribution
- Moffat distribution
